

208001–208100 

|-bgcolor=#fefefe
| 208001 ||  || — || April 21, 1998 || Socorro || LINEAR || — || align=right | 1.5 km || 
|-id=002 bgcolor=#E9E9E9
| 208002 ||  || — || June 26, 1998 || La Silla || E. W. Elst || EUN || align=right | 2.9 km || 
|-id=003 bgcolor=#fefefe
| 208003 ||  || — || July 26, 1998 || La Silla || E. W. Elst || FLO || align=right data-sort-value="0.82" | 820 m || 
|-id=004 bgcolor=#E9E9E9
| 208004 ||  || — || July 26, 1998 || La Silla || E. W. Elst || — || align=right | 2.0 km || 
|-id=005 bgcolor=#E9E9E9
| 208005 ||  || — || August 19, 1998 || Socorro || LINEAR || BRU || align=right | 4.9 km || 
|-id=006 bgcolor=#E9E9E9
| 208006 ||  || — || August 24, 1998 || Socorro || LINEAR || — || align=right | 2.7 km || 
|-id=007 bgcolor=#E9E9E9
| 208007 ||  || — || August 28, 1998 || Socorro || LINEAR || — || align=right | 4.1 km || 
|-id=008 bgcolor=#E9E9E9
| 208008 ||  || — || September 14, 1998 || Socorro || LINEAR || — || align=right | 1.5 km || 
|-id=009 bgcolor=#E9E9E9
| 208009 ||  || — || September 27, 1998 || Kitt Peak || Spacewatch || — || align=right | 2.3 km || 
|-id=010 bgcolor=#E9E9E9
| 208010 ||  || — || September 17, 1998 || Anderson Mesa || LONEOS || — || align=right | 3.4 km || 
|-id=011 bgcolor=#E9E9E9
| 208011 ||  || — || September 26, 1998 || Socorro || LINEAR || MAR || align=right | 1.8 km || 
|-id=012 bgcolor=#E9E9E9
| 208012 ||  || — || September 26, 1998 || Socorro || LINEAR || — || align=right | 4.4 km || 
|-id=013 bgcolor=#E9E9E9
| 208013 ||  || — || September 26, 1998 || Socorro || LINEAR || — || align=right | 2.0 km || 
|-id=014 bgcolor=#E9E9E9
| 208014 ||  || — || September 26, 1998 || Socorro || LINEAR || — || align=right | 2.4 km || 
|-id=015 bgcolor=#d6d6d6
| 208015 ||  || — || September 26, 1998 || Socorro || LINEAR || Tj (2.92) || align=right | 6.3 km || 
|-id=016 bgcolor=#E9E9E9
| 208016 ||  || — || October 13, 1998 || Kitt Peak || Spacewatch || MRX || align=right | 1.5 km || 
|-id=017 bgcolor=#E9E9E9
| 208017 ||  || — || October 13, 1998 || Kitt Peak || Spacewatch || — || align=right | 2.9 km || 
|-id=018 bgcolor=#E9E9E9
| 208018 ||  || — || October 15, 1998 || Kitt Peak || Spacewatch || — || align=right | 2.2 km || 
|-id=019 bgcolor=#E9E9E9
| 208019 ||  || — || October 22, 1998 || Kitt Peak || Spacewatch || — || align=right | 1.6 km || 
|-id=020 bgcolor=#fefefe
| 208020 ||  || — || October 22, 1998 || Kitt Peak || Spacewatch || V || align=right | 1.1 km || 
|-id=021 bgcolor=#E9E9E9
| 208021 ||  || — || November 24, 1998 || Socorro || LINEAR || — || align=right | 3.6 km || 
|-id=022 bgcolor=#E9E9E9
| 208022 ||  || — || December 10, 1998 || Kitt Peak || Spacewatch || — || align=right | 3.3 km || 
|-id=023 bgcolor=#FFC2E0
| 208023 ||  || — || January 14, 1999 || Socorro || LINEAR || ATEPHA || align=right data-sort-value="0.28" | 280 m || 
|-id=024 bgcolor=#fefefe
| 208024 ||  || — || January 11, 1999 || Kitt Peak || Spacewatch || FLO || align=right data-sort-value="0.81" | 810 m || 
|-id=025 bgcolor=#d6d6d6
| 208025 ||  || — || March 22, 1999 || Kitt Peak || Spacewatch || — || align=right | 2.8 km || 
|-id=026 bgcolor=#fefefe
| 208026 ||  || — || May 12, 1999 || Socorro || LINEAR || FLO || align=right | 1.0 km || 
|-id=027 bgcolor=#FA8072
| 208027 ||  || — || May 12, 1999 || Socorro || LINEAR || — || align=right | 1.2 km || 
|-id=028 bgcolor=#fefefe
| 208028 ||  || — || May 13, 1999 || Socorro || LINEAR || — || align=right data-sort-value="0.99" | 990 m || 
|-id=029 bgcolor=#d6d6d6
| 208029 ||  || — || June 8, 1999 || Socorro || LINEAR || — || align=right | 4.0 km || 
|-id=030 bgcolor=#fefefe
| 208030 ||  || — || June 11, 1999 || Catalina || CSS || — || align=right | 1.7 km || 
|-id=031 bgcolor=#fefefe
| 208031 ||  || — || July 14, 1999 || Socorro || LINEAR || — || align=right | 1.1 km || 
|-id=032 bgcolor=#E9E9E9
| 208032 ||  || — || July 14, 1999 || Socorro || LINEAR || — || align=right | 1.7 km || 
|-id=033 bgcolor=#fefefe
| 208033 || 1999 QR || — || August 20, 1999 || Kleť || Kleť Obs. || V || align=right | 1.2 km || 
|-id=034 bgcolor=#E9E9E9
| 208034 ||  || — || September 8, 1999 || Heppenheim || Starkenburg Obs. || EUN || align=right | 2.0 km || 
|-id=035 bgcolor=#fefefe
| 208035 ||  || — || September 11, 1999 || Ondřejov || P. Kušnirák, P. Pravec || — || align=right | 1.3 km || 
|-id=036 bgcolor=#E9E9E9
| 208036 ||  || — || September 14, 1999 || Prescott || P. G. Comba || — || align=right | 1.3 km || 
|-id=037 bgcolor=#d6d6d6
| 208037 ||  || — || September 7, 1999 || Socorro || LINEAR || EUP || align=right | 6.8 km || 
|-id=038 bgcolor=#fefefe
| 208038 ||  || — || September 7, 1999 || Socorro || LINEAR || — || align=right | 1.5 km || 
|-id=039 bgcolor=#fefefe
| 208039 ||  || — || September 9, 1999 || Socorro || LINEAR || SVE || align=right | 3.9 km || 
|-id=040 bgcolor=#fefefe
| 208040 ||  || — || September 9, 1999 || Socorro || LINEAR || — || align=right | 2.7 km || 
|-id=041 bgcolor=#fefefe
| 208041 ||  || — || September 9, 1999 || Socorro || LINEAR || NYS || align=right | 2.8 km || 
|-id=042 bgcolor=#fefefe
| 208042 ||  || — || September 9, 1999 || Socorro || LINEAR || V || align=right | 1.1 km || 
|-id=043 bgcolor=#E9E9E9
| 208043 ||  || — || September 14, 1999 || Kitt Peak || Spacewatch || MIS || align=right | 3.4 km || 
|-id=044 bgcolor=#E9E9E9
| 208044 ||  || — || September 4, 1999 || Catalina || CSS || — || align=right | 1.8 km || 
|-id=045 bgcolor=#fefefe
| 208045 ||  || — || September 7, 1999 || Socorro || LINEAR || — || align=right | 1.6 km || 
|-id=046 bgcolor=#E9E9E9
| 208046 ||  || — || October 6, 1999 || Kitt Peak || Spacewatch || — || align=right | 1.1 km || 
|-id=047 bgcolor=#fefefe
| 208047 ||  || — || October 4, 1999 || Socorro || LINEAR || NYS || align=right | 1.0 km || 
|-id=048 bgcolor=#fefefe
| 208048 ||  || — || October 7, 1999 || Socorro || LINEAR || ERI || align=right | 2.9 km || 
|-id=049 bgcolor=#fefefe
| 208049 ||  || — || October 9, 1999 || Socorro || LINEAR || NYS || align=right data-sort-value="0.98" | 980 m || 
|-id=050 bgcolor=#E9E9E9
| 208050 ||  || — || October 10, 1999 || Socorro || LINEAR || — || align=right | 1.5 km || 
|-id=051 bgcolor=#E9E9E9
| 208051 ||  || — || October 10, 1999 || Socorro || LINEAR || BRG || align=right | 3.1 km || 
|-id=052 bgcolor=#E9E9E9
| 208052 ||  || — || October 12, 1999 || Socorro || LINEAR || — || align=right | 1.9 km || 
|-id=053 bgcolor=#E9E9E9
| 208053 ||  || — || October 14, 1999 || Socorro || LINEAR || — || align=right | 2.3 km || 
|-id=054 bgcolor=#E9E9E9
| 208054 ||  || — || October 15, 1999 || Socorro || LINEAR || JUN || align=right | 1.8 km || 
|-id=055 bgcolor=#fefefe
| 208055 ||  || — || October 1, 1999 || Catalina || CSS || — || align=right | 1.7 km || 
|-id=056 bgcolor=#E9E9E9
| 208056 ||  || — || October 4, 1999 || Socorro || LINEAR || — || align=right | 1.1 km || 
|-id=057 bgcolor=#fefefe
| 208057 ||  || — || October 3, 1999 || Socorro || LINEAR || — || align=right | 3.3 km || 
|-id=058 bgcolor=#fefefe
| 208058 ||  || — || October 9, 1999 || Socorro || LINEAR || — || align=right | 1.3 km || 
|-id=059 bgcolor=#E9E9E9
| 208059 ||  || — || October 6, 1999 || Kitt Peak || Spacewatch || — || align=right data-sort-value="0.79" | 790 m || 
|-id=060 bgcolor=#fefefe
| 208060 ||  || — || October 12, 1999 || Kitt Peak || Spacewatch || — || align=right | 1.3 km || 
|-id=061 bgcolor=#E9E9E9
| 208061 ||  || — || October 30, 1999 || Kitt Peak || Spacewatch || — || align=right | 1.8 km || 
|-id=062 bgcolor=#fefefe
| 208062 ||  || — || October 31, 1999 || Kitt Peak || Spacewatch || — || align=right | 1.2 km || 
|-id=063 bgcolor=#E9E9E9
| 208063 ||  || — || October 31, 1999 || Kitt Peak || Spacewatch || — || align=right | 1.2 km || 
|-id=064 bgcolor=#fefefe
| 208064 ||  || — || October 31, 1999 || Kitt Peak || Spacewatch || — || align=right | 1.4 km || 
|-id=065 bgcolor=#E9E9E9
| 208065 ||  || — || October 28, 1999 || Catalina || CSS || — || align=right | 1.4 km || 
|-id=066 bgcolor=#E9E9E9
| 208066 ||  || — || October 19, 1999 || Kitt Peak || Spacewatch || — || align=right | 1.3 km || 
|-id=067 bgcolor=#E9E9E9
| 208067 ||  || — || November 9, 1999 || Višnjan Observatory || K. Korlević || — || align=right | 5.7 km || 
|-id=068 bgcolor=#E9E9E9
| 208068 ||  || — || November 3, 1999 || Socorro || LINEAR || INO || align=right | 1.7 km || 
|-id=069 bgcolor=#E9E9E9
| 208069 ||  || — || November 4, 1999 || Socorro || LINEAR || — || align=right | 2.1 km || 
|-id=070 bgcolor=#E9E9E9
| 208070 ||  || — || November 10, 1999 || Uccle || E. W. Elst || — || align=right | 1.5 km || 
|-id=071 bgcolor=#E9E9E9
| 208071 ||  || — || November 1, 1999 || Kitt Peak || Spacewatch || — || align=right | 1.0 km || 
|-id=072 bgcolor=#fefefe
| 208072 ||  || — || November 5, 1999 || Socorro || LINEAR || — || align=right | 1.8 km || 
|-id=073 bgcolor=#E9E9E9
| 208073 ||  || — || November 9, 1999 || Socorro || LINEAR || — || align=right | 1.9 km || 
|-id=074 bgcolor=#E9E9E9
| 208074 ||  || — || November 9, 1999 || Socorro || LINEAR || — || align=right | 1.1 km || 
|-id=075 bgcolor=#E9E9E9
| 208075 ||  || — || November 10, 1999 || Kitt Peak || Spacewatch || — || align=right data-sort-value="0.95" | 950 m || 
|-id=076 bgcolor=#E9E9E9
| 208076 ||  || — || November 14, 1999 || Socorro || LINEAR || — || align=right | 1.3 km || 
|-id=077 bgcolor=#E9E9E9
| 208077 ||  || — || November 14, 1999 || Socorro || LINEAR || — || align=right | 1.3 km || 
|-id=078 bgcolor=#E9E9E9
| 208078 ||  || — || November 14, 1999 || Socorro || LINEAR || — || align=right | 1.9 km || 
|-id=079 bgcolor=#E9E9E9
| 208079 ||  || — || November 6, 1999 || Socorro || LINEAR || — || align=right | 2.3 km || 
|-id=080 bgcolor=#E9E9E9
| 208080 ||  || — || November 7, 1999 || Socorro || LINEAR || — || align=right | 2.7 km || 
|-id=081 bgcolor=#fefefe
| 208081 ||  || — || November 12, 1999 || Socorro || LINEAR || — || align=right | 1.2 km || 
|-id=082 bgcolor=#E9E9E9
| 208082 ||  || — || November 29, 1999 || Kitt Peak || Spacewatch || — || align=right | 1.7 km || 
|-id=083 bgcolor=#E9E9E9
| 208083 ||  || — || December 2, 1999 || Kitt Peak || Spacewatch || HNS || align=right | 2.2 km || 
|-id=084 bgcolor=#E9E9E9
| 208084 ||  || — || December 7, 1999 || Socorro || LINEAR || — || align=right | 1.7 km || 
|-id=085 bgcolor=#E9E9E9
| 208085 ||  || — || December 7, 1999 || Socorro || LINEAR || — || align=right | 2.2 km || 
|-id=086 bgcolor=#E9E9E9
| 208086 ||  || — || December 7, 1999 || Socorro || LINEAR || BAR || align=right | 2.1 km || 
|-id=087 bgcolor=#E9E9E9
| 208087 ||  || — || December 12, 1999 || Socorro || LINEAR || — || align=right | 1.6 km || 
|-id=088 bgcolor=#E9E9E9
| 208088 ||  || — || December 6, 1999 || Kitt Peak || Spacewatch || — || align=right | 1.2 km || 
|-id=089 bgcolor=#E9E9E9
| 208089 ||  || — || December 8, 1999 || Kitt Peak || Spacewatch || MIS || align=right | 2.7 km || 
|-id=090 bgcolor=#E9E9E9
| 208090 ||  || — || December 8, 1999 || Socorro || LINEAR || — || align=right | 2.0 km || 
|-id=091 bgcolor=#E9E9E9
| 208091 ||  || — || December 13, 1999 || Socorro || LINEAR || JUN || align=right | 1.6 km || 
|-id=092 bgcolor=#E9E9E9
| 208092 ||  || — || December 14, 1999 || Socorro || LINEAR || — || align=right | 2.2 km || 
|-id=093 bgcolor=#E9E9E9
| 208093 ||  || — || December 13, 1999 || Kitt Peak || Spacewatch || — || align=right | 1.7 km || 
|-id=094 bgcolor=#E9E9E9
| 208094 ||  || — || December 27, 1999 || Kitt Peak || Spacewatch || — || align=right | 1.3 km || 
|-id=095 bgcolor=#E9E9E9
| 208095 ||  || — || January 3, 2000 || Socorro || LINEAR || — || align=right | 3.2 km || 
|-id=096 bgcolor=#E9E9E9
| 208096 ||  || — || January 5, 2000 || Socorro || LINEAR || ADE || align=right | 6.1 km || 
|-id=097 bgcolor=#E9E9E9
| 208097 ||  || — || January 6, 2000 || Socorro || LINEAR || — || align=right | 4.2 km || 
|-id=098 bgcolor=#E9E9E9
| 208098 ||  || — || January 3, 2000 || Socorro || LINEAR || — || align=right | 2.4 km || 
|-id=099 bgcolor=#E9E9E9
| 208099 ||  || — || January 9, 2000 || Socorro || LINEAR || LOR || align=right | 6.1 km || 
|-id=100 bgcolor=#E9E9E9
| 208100 ||  || — || January 8, 2000 || Kitt Peak || Spacewatch || MAR || align=right | 1.7 km || 
|}

208101–208200 

|-bgcolor=#E9E9E9
| 208101 ||  || — || January 7, 2000 || Kitt Peak || Spacewatch || — || align=right | 2.2 km || 
|-id=102 bgcolor=#E9E9E9
| 208102 ||  || — || January 26, 2000 || Višnjan Observatory || K. Korlević || — || align=right | 2.5 km || 
|-id=103 bgcolor=#E9E9E9
| 208103 ||  || — || January 29, 2000 || Socorro || LINEAR || BAR || align=right | 2.2 km || 
|-id=104 bgcolor=#E9E9E9
| 208104 ||  || — || January 29, 2000 || Socorro || LINEAR || — || align=right | 2.4 km || 
|-id=105 bgcolor=#E9E9E9
| 208105 ||  || — || January 28, 2000 || Kitt Peak || Spacewatch || ADE || align=right | 3.4 km || 
|-id=106 bgcolor=#E9E9E9
| 208106 ||  || — || January 26, 2000 || Kitt Peak || Spacewatch || — || align=right | 1.9 km || 
|-id=107 bgcolor=#E9E9E9
| 208107 ||  || — || January 29, 2000 || Kitt Peak || Spacewatch || — || align=right | 1.8 km || 
|-id=108 bgcolor=#E9E9E9
| 208108 ||  || — || January 27, 2000 || Kitt Peak || Spacewatch || WIT || align=right | 1.3 km || 
|-id=109 bgcolor=#E9E9E9
| 208109 ||  || — || January 16, 2000 || Kitt Peak || Spacewatch || HEN || align=right | 1.2 km || 
|-id=110 bgcolor=#E9E9E9
| 208110 ||  || — || February 2, 2000 || Socorro || LINEAR || — || align=right | 2.0 km || 
|-id=111 bgcolor=#E9E9E9
| 208111 ||  || — || February 2, 2000 || Socorro || LINEAR || HNS || align=right | 1.9 km || 
|-id=112 bgcolor=#E9E9E9
| 208112 ||  || — || February 1, 2000 || Kitt Peak || Spacewatch || — || align=right | 3.8 km || 
|-id=113 bgcolor=#E9E9E9
| 208113 ||  || — || February 7, 2000 || Kitt Peak || Spacewatch || — || align=right | 2.5 km || 
|-id=114 bgcolor=#E9E9E9
| 208114 ||  || — || February 8, 2000 || Kitt Peak || Spacewatch || — || align=right | 2.6 km || 
|-id=115 bgcolor=#FFC2E0
| 208115 ||  || — || February 15, 2000 || Socorro || LINEAR || APOPHA || align=right data-sort-value="0.26" | 260 m || 
|-id=116 bgcolor=#E9E9E9
| 208116 ||  || — || February 7, 2000 || Kitt Peak || Spacewatch || — || align=right | 2.1 km || 
|-id=117 bgcolor=#E9E9E9
| 208117 ||  || — || February 6, 2000 || Kitt Peak || M. W. Buie || — || align=right | 2.9 km || 
|-id=118 bgcolor=#E9E9E9
| 208118 ||  || — || February 6, 2000 || Socorro || LINEAR || — || align=right | 4.2 km || 
|-id=119 bgcolor=#E9E9E9
| 208119 ||  || — || February 5, 2000 || Kitt Peak || Spacewatch || — || align=right | 2.3 km || 
|-id=120 bgcolor=#E9E9E9
| 208120 ||  || — || February 26, 2000 || Kitt Peak || Spacewatch || — || align=right | 3.7 km || 
|-id=121 bgcolor=#E9E9E9
| 208121 ||  || — || February 26, 2000 || Kitt Peak || Spacewatch || HEN || align=right | 1.4 km || 
|-id=122 bgcolor=#E9E9E9
| 208122 ||  || — || February 28, 2000 || Kitt Peak || Spacewatch || — || align=right | 1.9 km || 
|-id=123 bgcolor=#E9E9E9
| 208123 ||  || — || February 29, 2000 || Socorro || LINEAR || — || align=right | 3.3 km || 
|-id=124 bgcolor=#E9E9E9
| 208124 ||  || — || February 29, 2000 || Socorro || LINEAR || NEM || align=right | 3.6 km || 
|-id=125 bgcolor=#E9E9E9
| 208125 ||  || — || February 29, 2000 || Socorro || LINEAR || EUN || align=right | 1.6 km || 
|-id=126 bgcolor=#E9E9E9
| 208126 ||  || — || February 29, 2000 || Socorro || LINEAR || — || align=right | 3.4 km || 
|-id=127 bgcolor=#E9E9E9
| 208127 ||  || — || February 29, 2000 || Socorro || LINEAR || — || align=right | 3.4 km || 
|-id=128 bgcolor=#E9E9E9
| 208128 ||  || — || February 29, 2000 || Socorro || LINEAR || MRX || align=right | 1.3 km || 
|-id=129 bgcolor=#E9E9E9
| 208129 ||  || — || February 29, 2000 || Socorro || LINEAR || — || align=right | 2.6 km || 
|-id=130 bgcolor=#E9E9E9
| 208130 ||  || — || February 29, 2000 || Socorro || LINEAR || — || align=right | 2.7 km || 
|-id=131 bgcolor=#E9E9E9
| 208131 ||  || — || February 27, 2000 || Kitt Peak || Spacewatch || HEN || align=right | 1.3 km || 
|-id=132 bgcolor=#E9E9E9
| 208132 ||  || — || February 25, 2000 || Uccle || T. Pauwels || — || align=right | 3.2 km || 
|-id=133 bgcolor=#E9E9E9
| 208133 ||  || — || February 27, 2000 || Kitt Peak || Spacewatch || WIT || align=right | 1.6 km || 
|-id=134 bgcolor=#E9E9E9
| 208134 ||  || — || March 3, 2000 || Kitt Peak || Spacewatch || — || align=right | 2.7 km || 
|-id=135 bgcolor=#E9E9E9
| 208135 ||  || — || March 2, 2000 || San Marcello || L. Tesi, A. Boattini || — || align=right | 2.0 km || 
|-id=136 bgcolor=#E9E9E9
| 208136 ||  || — || March 4, 2000 || Socorro || LINEAR || ADE || align=right | 4.2 km || 
|-id=137 bgcolor=#E9E9E9
| 208137 ||  || — || March 4, 2000 || Socorro || LINEAR || — || align=right | 2.8 km || 
|-id=138 bgcolor=#E9E9E9
| 208138 ||  || — || March 5, 2000 || Socorro || LINEAR || — || align=right | 3.9 km || 
|-id=139 bgcolor=#E9E9E9
| 208139 ||  || — || March 5, 2000 || Socorro || LINEAR || — || align=right | 2.9 km || 
|-id=140 bgcolor=#d6d6d6
| 208140 ||  || — || March 5, 2000 || Socorro || LINEAR || KOR || align=right | 2.6 km || 
|-id=141 bgcolor=#E9E9E9
| 208141 ||  || — || March 5, 2000 || Socorro || LINEAR || — || align=right | 2.6 km || 
|-id=142 bgcolor=#E9E9E9
| 208142 ||  || — || March 12, 2000 || Socorro || LINEAR || — || align=right | 4.2 km || 
|-id=143 bgcolor=#E9E9E9
| 208143 ||  || — || March 2, 2000 || Kitt Peak || Spacewatch || NEM || align=right | 3.3 km || 
|-id=144 bgcolor=#E9E9E9
| 208144 ||  || — || March 6, 2000 || Haleakala || NEAT || — || align=right | 5.0 km || 
|-id=145 bgcolor=#E9E9E9
| 208145 ||  || — || March 3, 2000 || Socorro || LINEAR || — || align=right | 3.5 km || 
|-id=146 bgcolor=#E9E9E9
| 208146 ||  || — || March 4, 2000 || Socorro || LINEAR || — || align=right | 3.1 km || 
|-id=147 bgcolor=#E9E9E9
| 208147 ||  || — || March 10, 2000 || Socorro || LINEAR || PAD || align=right | 2.6 km || 
|-id=148 bgcolor=#E9E9E9
| 208148 ||  || — || March 27, 2000 || Kitt Peak || Spacewatch || MRX || align=right | 1.6 km || 
|-id=149 bgcolor=#E9E9E9
| 208149 ||  || — || March 27, 2000 || Anderson Mesa || LONEOS || — || align=right | 4.8 km || 
|-id=150 bgcolor=#E9E9E9
| 208150 ||  || — || March 29, 2000 || Socorro || LINEAR || — || align=right | 4.1 km || 
|-id=151 bgcolor=#E9E9E9
| 208151 ||  || — || March 25, 2000 || Kitt Peak || Spacewatch || AST || align=right | 2.2 km || 
|-id=152 bgcolor=#E9E9E9
| 208152 ||  || — || April 5, 2000 || Socorro || LINEAR || — || align=right | 3.8 km || 
|-id=153 bgcolor=#E9E9E9
| 208153 ||  || — || April 6, 2000 || Kitt Peak || Spacewatch || DOR || align=right | 3.0 km || 
|-id=154 bgcolor=#E9E9E9
| 208154 ||  || — || April 8, 2000 || Bergisch Gladbach || W. Bickel || — || align=right | 3.4 km || 
|-id=155 bgcolor=#E9E9E9
| 208155 ||  || — || April 7, 2000 || Anderson Mesa || LONEOS || — || align=right | 3.7 km || 
|-id=156 bgcolor=#E9E9E9
| 208156 ||  || — || April 5, 2000 || Socorro || LINEAR || — || align=right | 3.3 km || 
|-id=157 bgcolor=#E9E9E9
| 208157 ||  || — || April 5, 2000 || Socorro || LINEAR || XIZ || align=right | 2.0 km || 
|-id=158 bgcolor=#E9E9E9
| 208158 ||  || — || April 25, 2000 || Kitt Peak || Spacewatch || TIN || align=right | 4.0 km || 
|-id=159 bgcolor=#d6d6d6
| 208159 ||  || — || April 30, 2000 || Socorro || LINEAR || — || align=right | 5.1 km || 
|-id=160 bgcolor=#E9E9E9
| 208160 ||  || — || April 24, 2000 || Anderson Mesa || LONEOS || — || align=right | 4.1 km || 
|-id=161 bgcolor=#E9E9E9
| 208161 ||  || — || April 30, 2000 || Anderson Mesa || LONEOS || POS || align=right | 3.2 km || 
|-id=162 bgcolor=#E9E9E9
| 208162 ||  || — || May 27, 2000 || Anderson Mesa || LONEOS || — || align=right | 3.5 km || 
|-id=163 bgcolor=#fefefe
| 208163 ||  || — || July 3, 2000 || Kitt Peak || Spacewatch || — || align=right data-sort-value="0.77" | 770 m || 
|-id=164 bgcolor=#fefefe
| 208164 ||  || — || July 30, 2000 || Socorro || LINEAR || — || align=right | 1.3 km || 
|-id=165 bgcolor=#fefefe
| 208165 ||  || — || July 30, 2000 || Socorro || LINEAR || V || align=right | 1.1 km || 
|-id=166 bgcolor=#fefefe
| 208166 ||  || — || July 30, 2000 || Socorro || LINEAR || V || align=right | 1.1 km || 
|-id=167 bgcolor=#fefefe
| 208167 ||  || — || July 29, 2000 || Anderson Mesa || LONEOS || NYS || align=right data-sort-value="0.82" | 820 m || 
|-id=168 bgcolor=#fefefe
| 208168 ||  || — || August 1, 2000 || Socorro || LINEAR || — || align=right | 1.0 km || 
|-id=169 bgcolor=#fefefe
| 208169 ||  || — || August 2, 2000 || Kitt Peak || Spacewatch || V || align=right data-sort-value="0.86" | 860 m || 
|-id=170 bgcolor=#d6d6d6
| 208170 || 2000 QG || — || August 21, 2000 || Prescott || P. G. Comba || — || align=right | 4.7 km || 
|-id=171 bgcolor=#fefefe
| 208171 ||  || — || August 24, 2000 || Socorro || LINEAR || — || align=right | 1.2 km || 
|-id=172 bgcolor=#d6d6d6
| 208172 ||  || — || August 24, 2000 || Socorro || LINEAR || — || align=right | 3.0 km || 
|-id=173 bgcolor=#d6d6d6
| 208173 ||  || — || August 25, 2000 || Socorro || LINEAR || TIRslow || align=right | 5.2 km || 
|-id=174 bgcolor=#d6d6d6
| 208174 ||  || — || August 24, 2000 || Socorro || LINEAR || TIR || align=right | 4.9 km || 
|-id=175 bgcolor=#fefefe
| 208175 ||  || — || August 24, 2000 || Socorro || LINEAR || ERI || align=right | 2.3 km || 
|-id=176 bgcolor=#fefefe
| 208176 ||  || — || August 24, 2000 || Socorro || LINEAR || — || align=right | 1.1 km || 
|-id=177 bgcolor=#fefefe
| 208177 ||  || — || August 29, 2000 || Socorro || LINEAR || PHO || align=right | 3.9 km || 
|-id=178 bgcolor=#fefefe
| 208178 ||  || — || August 24, 2000 || Socorro || LINEAR || NYS || align=right data-sort-value="0.84" | 840 m || 
|-id=179 bgcolor=#d6d6d6
| 208179 ||  || — || August 24, 2000 || Socorro || LINEAR || — || align=right | 5.4 km || 
|-id=180 bgcolor=#fefefe
| 208180 ||  || — || August 28, 2000 || Socorro || LINEAR || — || align=right | 1.3 km || 
|-id=181 bgcolor=#d6d6d6
| 208181 ||  || — || August 31, 2000 || Kitt Peak || Spacewatch || EOS || align=right | 2.7 km || 
|-id=182 bgcolor=#fefefe
| 208182 ||  || — || August 25, 2000 || Socorro || LINEAR || ERI || align=right | 2.7 km || 
|-id=183 bgcolor=#d6d6d6
| 208183 ||  || — || August 29, 2000 || Socorro || LINEAR || — || align=right | 4.1 km || 
|-id=184 bgcolor=#fefefe
| 208184 ||  || — || August 26, 2000 || Socorro || LINEAR || FLO || align=right | 1.5 km || 
|-id=185 bgcolor=#d6d6d6
| 208185 ||  || — || August 31, 2000 || Socorro || LINEAR || TIR || align=right | 7.4 km || 
|-id=186 bgcolor=#d6d6d6
| 208186 ||  || — || August 31, 2000 || Socorro || LINEAR || EUP || align=right | 7.4 km || 
|-id=187 bgcolor=#fefefe
| 208187 ||  || — || August 31, 2000 || Socorro || LINEAR || — || align=right | 1.2 km || 
|-id=188 bgcolor=#d6d6d6
| 208188 ||  || — || August 31, 2000 || Socorro || LINEAR || EOS || align=right | 3.3 km || 
|-id=189 bgcolor=#fefefe
| 208189 ||  || — || August 26, 2000 || Socorro || LINEAR || — || align=right data-sort-value="0.97" | 970 m || 
|-id=190 bgcolor=#d6d6d6
| 208190 ||  || — || August 29, 2000 || Socorro || LINEAR || — || align=right | 4.2 km || 
|-id=191 bgcolor=#d6d6d6
| 208191 ||  || — || August 29, 2000 || Socorro || LINEAR || — || align=right | 6.1 km || 
|-id=192 bgcolor=#fefefe
| 208192 ||  || — || August 29, 2000 || Socorro || LINEAR || NYS || align=right | 1.1 km || 
|-id=193 bgcolor=#fefefe
| 208193 ||  || — || August 31, 2000 || Socorro || LINEAR || NYS || align=right | 1.1 km || 
|-id=194 bgcolor=#fefefe
| 208194 ||  || — || August 31, 2000 || Socorro || LINEAR || FLO || align=right | 1.1 km || 
|-id=195 bgcolor=#d6d6d6
| 208195 ||  || — || August 31, 2000 || Socorro || LINEAR || EUP || align=right | 6.0 km || 
|-id=196 bgcolor=#d6d6d6
| 208196 ||  || — || August 27, 2000 || Cerro Tololo || M. W. Buie || THM || align=right | 4.6 km || 
|-id=197 bgcolor=#fefefe
| 208197 ||  || — || September 1, 2000 || Socorro || LINEAR || H || align=right data-sort-value="0.74" | 740 m || 
|-id=198 bgcolor=#d6d6d6
| 208198 ||  || — || September 1, 2000 || Socorro || LINEAR || — || align=right | 5.2 km || 
|-id=199 bgcolor=#fefefe
| 208199 ||  || — || September 3, 2000 || Socorro || LINEAR || PHO || align=right | 1.5 km || 
|-id=200 bgcolor=#fefefe
| 208200 ||  || — || September 5, 2000 || Kvistaberg || UDAS || — || align=right | 1.6 km || 
|}

208201–208300 

|-bgcolor=#fefefe
| 208201 ||  || — || September 7, 2000 || Kitt Peak || Spacewatch || — || align=right | 1.3 km || 
|-id=202 bgcolor=#fefefe
| 208202 ||  || — || September 3, 2000 || Socorro || LINEAR || — || align=right | 1.4 km || 
|-id=203 bgcolor=#fefefe
| 208203 ||  || — || September 21, 2000 || Socorro || LINEAR || PHO || align=right | 1.1 km || 
|-id=204 bgcolor=#d6d6d6
| 208204 ||  || — || September 23, 2000 || Socorro || LINEAR || — || align=right | 6.2 km || 
|-id=205 bgcolor=#fefefe
| 208205 ||  || — || September 24, 2000 || Socorro || LINEAR || — || align=right | 1.6 km || 
|-id=206 bgcolor=#fefefe
| 208206 ||  || — || September 26, 2000 || Bisei SG Center || BATTeRS || — || align=right | 1.6 km || 
|-id=207 bgcolor=#E9E9E9
| 208207 ||  || — || September 22, 2000 || Socorro || LINEAR || PAL || align=right | 4.1 km || 
|-id=208 bgcolor=#d6d6d6
| 208208 ||  || — || September 24, 2000 || Socorro || LINEAR || EOS || align=right | 2.9 km || 
|-id=209 bgcolor=#d6d6d6
| 208209 ||  || — || September 24, 2000 || Socorro || LINEAR || — || align=right | 5.8 km || 
|-id=210 bgcolor=#d6d6d6
| 208210 ||  || — || September 24, 2000 || Socorro || LINEAR || — || align=right | 4.1 km || 
|-id=211 bgcolor=#fefefe
| 208211 ||  || — || September 24, 2000 || Socorro || LINEAR || NYS || align=right data-sort-value="0.88" | 880 m || 
|-id=212 bgcolor=#fefefe
| 208212 ||  || — || September 24, 2000 || Socorro || LINEAR || MAS || align=right data-sort-value="0.85" | 850 m || 
|-id=213 bgcolor=#fefefe
| 208213 ||  || — || September 24, 2000 || Socorro || LINEAR || NYS || align=right data-sort-value="0.89" | 890 m || 
|-id=214 bgcolor=#fefefe
| 208214 ||  || — || September 24, 2000 || Socorro || LINEAR || — || align=right | 1.5 km || 
|-id=215 bgcolor=#fefefe
| 208215 ||  || — || September 24, 2000 || Socorro || LINEAR || — || align=right | 1.2 km || 
|-id=216 bgcolor=#d6d6d6
| 208216 ||  || — || September 24, 2000 || Socorro || LINEAR || — || align=right | 8.2 km || 
|-id=217 bgcolor=#fefefe
| 208217 ||  || — || September 24, 2000 || Socorro || LINEAR || — || align=right | 1.2 km || 
|-id=218 bgcolor=#fefefe
| 208218 ||  || — || September 24, 2000 || Socorro || LINEAR || V || align=right | 1.0 km || 
|-id=219 bgcolor=#fefefe
| 208219 ||  || — || September 24, 2000 || Socorro || LINEAR || — || align=right | 1.4 km || 
|-id=220 bgcolor=#fefefe
| 208220 ||  || — || September 24, 2000 || Socorro || LINEAR || MAS || align=right | 1.2 km || 
|-id=221 bgcolor=#fefefe
| 208221 ||  || — || September 24, 2000 || Socorro || LINEAR || — || align=right | 1.5 km || 
|-id=222 bgcolor=#fefefe
| 208222 ||  || — || September 24, 2000 || Socorro || LINEAR || NYS || align=right | 1.1 km || 
|-id=223 bgcolor=#fefefe
| 208223 ||  || — || September 23, 2000 || Socorro || LINEAR || — || align=right | 1.6 km || 
|-id=224 bgcolor=#fefefe
| 208224 ||  || — || September 24, 2000 || Socorro || LINEAR || — || align=right data-sort-value="0.96" | 960 m || 
|-id=225 bgcolor=#fefefe
| 208225 ||  || — || September 24, 2000 || Socorro || LINEAR || FLO || align=right | 1.6 km || 
|-id=226 bgcolor=#FA8072
| 208226 ||  || — || September 27, 2000 || Socorro || LINEAR || — || align=right | 1.2 km || 
|-id=227 bgcolor=#fefefe
| 208227 ||  || — || September 27, 2000 || Socorro || LINEAR || — || align=right | 1.1 km || 
|-id=228 bgcolor=#fefefe
| 208228 ||  || — || September 24, 2000 || Socorro || LINEAR || NYS || align=right data-sort-value="0.96" | 960 m || 
|-id=229 bgcolor=#d6d6d6
| 208229 ||  || — || September 24, 2000 || Socorro || LINEAR || HYG || align=right | 4.2 km || 
|-id=230 bgcolor=#fefefe
| 208230 ||  || — || September 24, 2000 || Socorro || LINEAR || NYS || align=right data-sort-value="0.86" | 860 m || 
|-id=231 bgcolor=#fefefe
| 208231 ||  || — || September 24, 2000 || Socorro || LINEAR || — || align=right | 1.0 km || 
|-id=232 bgcolor=#d6d6d6
| 208232 ||  || — || September 25, 2000 || Socorro || LINEAR || — || align=right | 4.2 km || 
|-id=233 bgcolor=#fefefe
| 208233 ||  || — || September 26, 2000 || Socorro || LINEAR || NYS || align=right | 1.1 km || 
|-id=234 bgcolor=#fefefe
| 208234 ||  || — || September 28, 2000 || Socorro || LINEAR || NYS || align=right data-sort-value="0.98" | 980 m || 
|-id=235 bgcolor=#fefefe
| 208235 ||  || — || September 23, 2000 || Socorro || LINEAR || — || align=right | 1.3 km || 
|-id=236 bgcolor=#fefefe
| 208236 ||  || — || September 28, 2000 || Socorro || LINEAR || FLO || align=right data-sort-value="0.85" | 850 m || 
|-id=237 bgcolor=#d6d6d6
| 208237 ||  || — || September 29, 2000 || Kitt Peak || Spacewatch || — || align=right | 4.7 km || 
|-id=238 bgcolor=#fefefe
| 208238 ||  || — || September 29, 2000 || Kitt Peak || Spacewatch || — || align=right data-sort-value="0.81" | 810 m || 
|-id=239 bgcolor=#fefefe
| 208239 ||  || — || September 29, 2000 || Xinglong || SCAP || NYS || align=right data-sort-value="0.94" | 940 m || 
|-id=240 bgcolor=#fefefe
| 208240 ||  || — || September 26, 2000 || Anderson Mesa || LONEOS || — || align=right data-sort-value="0.90" | 900 m || 
|-id=241 bgcolor=#fefefe
| 208241 ||  || — || October 1, 2000 || Socorro || LINEAR || — || align=right | 1.5 km || 
|-id=242 bgcolor=#fefefe
| 208242 ||  || — || October 1, 2000 || Socorro || LINEAR || V || align=right data-sort-value="0.99" | 990 m || 
|-id=243 bgcolor=#fefefe
| 208243 ||  || — || October 1, 2000 || Socorro || LINEAR || V || align=right | 1.0 km || 
|-id=244 bgcolor=#fefefe
| 208244 ||  || — || October 1, 2000 || Socorro || LINEAR || — || align=right | 1.4 km || 
|-id=245 bgcolor=#fefefe
| 208245 ||  || — || October 1, 2000 || Socorro || LINEAR || — || align=right | 1.2 km || 
|-id=246 bgcolor=#fefefe
| 208246 ||  || — || October 29, 2000 || Socorro || LINEAR || — || align=right | 1.9 km || 
|-id=247 bgcolor=#fefefe
| 208247 ||  || — || October 29, 2000 || Kitt Peak || Spacewatch || MAS || align=right | 1.1 km || 
|-id=248 bgcolor=#fefefe
| 208248 ||  || — || October 24, 2000 || Socorro || LINEAR || V || align=right | 1.1 km || 
|-id=249 bgcolor=#fefefe
| 208249 ||  || — || October 24, 2000 || Socorro || LINEAR || — || align=right | 1.2 km || 
|-id=250 bgcolor=#fefefe
| 208250 ||  || — || October 25, 2000 || Socorro || LINEAR || V || align=right data-sort-value="0.97" | 970 m || 
|-id=251 bgcolor=#fefefe
| 208251 ||  || — || November 1, 2000 || Socorro || LINEAR || V || align=right | 1.0 km || 
|-id=252 bgcolor=#fefefe
| 208252 ||  || — || November 1, 2000 || Socorro || LINEAR || MAS || align=right data-sort-value="0.93" | 930 m || 
|-id=253 bgcolor=#fefefe
| 208253 ||  || — || November 1, 2000 || Socorro || LINEAR || MAS || align=right | 1.2 km || 
|-id=254 bgcolor=#fefefe
| 208254 ||  || — || November 1, 2000 || Socorro || LINEAR || — || align=right | 1.2 km || 
|-id=255 bgcolor=#fefefe
| 208255 ||  || — || November 3, 2000 || Socorro || LINEAR || ERI || align=right | 3.4 km || 
|-id=256 bgcolor=#fefefe
| 208256 ||  || — || November 3, 2000 || Socorro || LINEAR || — || align=right | 2.3 km || 
|-id=257 bgcolor=#fefefe
| 208257 ||  || — || November 3, 2000 || Socorro || LINEAR || — || align=right | 1.9 km || 
|-id=258 bgcolor=#fefefe
| 208258 ||  || — || November 3, 2000 || Socorro || LINEAR || — || align=right | 1.2 km || 
|-id=259 bgcolor=#fefefe
| 208259 ||  || — || November 19, 2000 || Socorro || LINEAR || V || align=right | 1.3 km || 
|-id=260 bgcolor=#fefefe
| 208260 ||  || — || November 21, 2000 || Socorro || LINEAR || NYS || align=right data-sort-value="0.90" | 900 m || 
|-id=261 bgcolor=#fefefe
| 208261 ||  || — || November 20, 2000 || Socorro || LINEAR || — || align=right | 1.2 km || 
|-id=262 bgcolor=#fefefe
| 208262 ||  || — || November 25, 2000 || Kitt Peak || Spacewatch || — || align=right | 1.2 km || 
|-id=263 bgcolor=#fefefe
| 208263 ||  || — || November 21, 2000 || Socorro || LINEAR || PHO || align=right | 1.9 km || 
|-id=264 bgcolor=#fefefe
| 208264 ||  || — || November 20, 2000 || Socorro || LINEAR || — || align=right | 1.4 km || 
|-id=265 bgcolor=#fefefe
| 208265 ||  || — || November 20, 2000 || Socorro || LINEAR || — || align=right | 1.4 km || 
|-id=266 bgcolor=#fefefe
| 208266 ||  || — || November 20, 2000 || Socorro || LINEAR || — || align=right | 1.4 km || 
|-id=267 bgcolor=#fefefe
| 208267 ||  || — || November 24, 2000 || Anderson Mesa || LONEOS || — || align=right | 1.2 km || 
|-id=268 bgcolor=#fefefe
| 208268 ||  || — || November 23, 2000 || Eskridge || G. Hug || — || align=right | 1.4 km || 
|-id=269 bgcolor=#fefefe
| 208269 || 2000 XM || — || December 1, 2000 || Kitt Peak || Spacewatch || NYS || align=right data-sort-value="0.72" | 720 m || 
|-id=270 bgcolor=#fefefe
| 208270 || 2000 XQ || — || December 1, 2000 || Kitt Peak || Spacewatch || — || align=right | 1.4 km || 
|-id=271 bgcolor=#fefefe
| 208271 ||  || — || December 28, 2000 || Kitt Peak || Spacewatch || MAS || align=right | 1.0 km || 
|-id=272 bgcolor=#fefefe
| 208272 ||  || — || December 22, 2000 || Socorro || LINEAR || — || align=right | 1.4 km || 
|-id=273 bgcolor=#E9E9E9
| 208273 ||  || — || December 30, 2000 || Socorro || LINEAR || ADE || align=right | 2.3 km || 
|-id=274 bgcolor=#fefefe
| 208274 ||  || — || December 30, 2000 || Socorro || LINEAR || MAS || align=right | 1.1 km || 
|-id=275 bgcolor=#fefefe
| 208275 ||  || — || December 30, 2000 || Socorro || LINEAR || MAS || align=right | 1.0 km || 
|-id=276 bgcolor=#fefefe
| 208276 ||  || — || December 30, 2000 || Socorro || LINEAR || — || align=right | 1.3 km || 
|-id=277 bgcolor=#fefefe
| 208277 ||  || — || December 30, 2000 || Socorro || LINEAR || NYS || align=right | 1.1 km || 
|-id=278 bgcolor=#fefefe
| 208278 ||  || — || January 15, 2001 || Socorro || LINEAR || NYS || align=right | 1.0 km || 
|-id=279 bgcolor=#FA8072
| 208279 ||  || — || January 17, 2001 || Socorro || LINEAR || H || align=right | 1.4 km || 
|-id=280 bgcolor=#fefefe
| 208280 ||  || — || January 16, 2001 || Kitt Peak || Spacewatch || NYS || align=right data-sort-value="0.92" | 920 m || 
|-id=281 bgcolor=#fefefe
| 208281 ||  || — || January 19, 2001 || Socorro || LINEAR || H || align=right data-sort-value="0.92" | 920 m || 
|-id=282 bgcolor=#fefefe
| 208282 ||  || — || January 19, 2001 || Socorro || LINEAR || V || align=right | 1.3 km || 
|-id=283 bgcolor=#E9E9E9
| 208283 ||  || — || January 21, 2001 || Socorro || LINEAR || BAR || align=right | 2.4 km || 
|-id=284 bgcolor=#fefefe
| 208284 ||  || — || January 17, 2001 || Haleakala || NEAT || H || align=right | 1.0 km || 
|-id=285 bgcolor=#fefefe
| 208285 ||  || — || January 31, 2001 || Socorro || LINEAR || H || align=right | 1.2 km || 
|-id=286 bgcolor=#fefefe
| 208286 ||  || — || February 1, 2001 || Socorro || LINEAR || — || align=right | 2.6 km || 
|-id=287 bgcolor=#E9E9E9
| 208287 ||  || — || February 1, 2001 || Socorro || LINEAR || ADE || align=right | 4.1 km || 
|-id=288 bgcolor=#E9E9E9
| 208288 ||  || — || February 15, 2001 || Socorro || LINEAR || — || align=right | 3.9 km || 
|-id=289 bgcolor=#E9E9E9
| 208289 ||  || — || February 13, 2001 || Socorro || LINEAR || — || align=right | 3.9 km || 
|-id=290 bgcolor=#d6d6d6
| 208290 ||  || — || February 16, 2001 || Kitt Peak || Spacewatch || 3:2 || align=right | 5.5 km || 
|-id=291 bgcolor=#fefefe
| 208291 ||  || — || February 19, 2001 || Socorro || LINEAR || H || align=right data-sort-value="0.80" | 800 m || 
|-id=292 bgcolor=#E9E9E9
| 208292 ||  || — || February 17, 2001 || Socorro || LINEAR || — || align=right | 1.5 km || 
|-id=293 bgcolor=#E9E9E9
| 208293 ||  || — || February 17, 2001 || Socorro || LINEAR || — || align=right | 2.1 km || 
|-id=294 bgcolor=#E9E9E9
| 208294 ||  || — || February 22, 2001 || Kitt Peak || Spacewatch || — || align=right | 2.2 km || 
|-id=295 bgcolor=#d6d6d6
| 208295 ||  || — || March 19, 2001 || Kitt Peak || Spacewatch || — || align=right | 3.3 km || 
|-id=296 bgcolor=#E9E9E9
| 208296 ||  || — || March 19, 2001 || Anderson Mesa || LONEOS || — || align=right | 3.3 km || 
|-id=297 bgcolor=#fefefe
| 208297 ||  || — || March 19, 2001 || Socorro || LINEAR || H || align=right data-sort-value="0.81" | 810 m || 
|-id=298 bgcolor=#E9E9E9
| 208298 ||  || — || March 18, 2001 || Socorro || LINEAR || — || align=right | 1.4 km || 
|-id=299 bgcolor=#E9E9E9
| 208299 ||  || — || March 19, 2001 || Socorro || LINEAR || — || align=right | 2.2 km || 
|-id=300 bgcolor=#E9E9E9
| 208300 ||  || — || March 19, 2001 || Socorro || LINEAR || — || align=right | 1.9 km || 
|}

208301–208400 

|-bgcolor=#E9E9E9
| 208301 ||  || — || March 17, 2001 || Prescott || P. G. Comba || — || align=right | 1.4 km || 
|-id=302 bgcolor=#E9E9E9
| 208302 ||  || — || March 18, 2001 || Socorro || LINEAR || — || align=right | 1.6 km || 
|-id=303 bgcolor=#E9E9E9
| 208303 ||  || — || March 20, 2001 || Kitt Peak || Spacewatch || ADE || align=right | 2.7 km || 
|-id=304 bgcolor=#E9E9E9
| 208304 ||  || — || March 20, 2001 || Haleakala || NEAT || RAF || align=right | 2.0 km || 
|-id=305 bgcolor=#E9E9E9
| 208305 ||  || — || March 24, 2001 || Anderson Mesa || LONEOS || — || align=right | 3.3 km || 
|-id=306 bgcolor=#fefefe
| 208306 ||  || — || March 27, 2001 || Anderson Mesa || LONEOS || H || align=right | 1.1 km || 
|-id=307 bgcolor=#E9E9E9
| 208307 ||  || — || March 19, 2001 || Socorro || LINEAR || — || align=right | 1.8 km || 
|-id=308 bgcolor=#E9E9E9
| 208308 ||  || — || April 17, 2001 || Socorro || LINEAR || — || align=right | 1.4 km || 
|-id=309 bgcolor=#E9E9E9
| 208309 ||  || — || April 18, 2001 || Kitt Peak || Spacewatch || — || align=right | 1.9 km || 
|-id=310 bgcolor=#E9E9E9
| 208310 ||  || — || April 27, 2001 || Socorro || LINEAR || EUN || align=right | 2.2 km || 
|-id=311 bgcolor=#E9E9E9
| 208311 ||  || — || April 16, 2001 || Socorro || LINEAR || — || align=right | 1.6 km || 
|-id=312 bgcolor=#E9E9E9
| 208312 ||  || — || May 15, 2001 || Haleakala || NEAT || — || align=right | 1.5 km || 
|-id=313 bgcolor=#E9E9E9
| 208313 ||  || — || May 19, 2001 || Haleakala || NEAT || — || align=right | 2.3 km || 
|-id=314 bgcolor=#E9E9E9
| 208314 ||  || — || May 18, 2001 || Socorro || LINEAR || — || align=right | 1.8 km || 
|-id=315 bgcolor=#E9E9E9
| 208315 ||  || — || May 17, 2001 || Socorro || LINEAR || — || align=right | 4.5 km || 
|-id=316 bgcolor=#E9E9E9
| 208316 || 2001 ME || — || June 16, 2001 || Desert Beaver || W. K. Y. Yeung || — || align=right | 3.6 km || 
|-id=317 bgcolor=#E9E9E9
| 208317 ||  || — || June 20, 2001 || Palomar || NEAT || — || align=right | 2.2 km || 
|-id=318 bgcolor=#E9E9E9
| 208318 ||  || — || June 20, 2001 || Haleakala || NEAT || — || align=right | 2.2 km || 
|-id=319 bgcolor=#E9E9E9
| 208319 ||  || — || June 24, 2001 || Kitt Peak || Spacewatch || RAF || align=right | 1.7 km || 
|-id=320 bgcolor=#d6d6d6
| 208320 ||  || — || July 14, 2001 || Palomar || NEAT || — || align=right | 4.1 km || 
|-id=321 bgcolor=#E9E9E9
| 208321 ||  || — || July 13, 2001 || Palomar || NEAT || — || align=right | 3.0 km || 
|-id=322 bgcolor=#d6d6d6
| 208322 ||  || — || July 21, 2001 || Anderson Mesa || LONEOS || — || align=right | 6.5 km || 
|-id=323 bgcolor=#E9E9E9
| 208323 ||  || — || July 16, 2001 || Haleakala || NEAT || — || align=right | 2.9 km || 
|-id=324 bgcolor=#d6d6d6
| 208324 ||  || — || August 8, 2001 || Haleakala || NEAT || — || align=right | 5.1 km || 
|-id=325 bgcolor=#d6d6d6
| 208325 ||  || — || August 11, 2001 || Palomar || NEAT || — || align=right | 4.4 km || 
|-id=326 bgcolor=#d6d6d6
| 208326 ||  || — || August 14, 2001 || Haleakala || NEAT || — || align=right | 3.7 km || 
|-id=327 bgcolor=#E9E9E9
| 208327 ||  || — || August 13, 2001 || Palomar || NEAT || — || align=right | 2.5 km || 
|-id=328 bgcolor=#E9E9E9
| 208328 ||  || — || August 16, 2001 || Socorro || LINEAR || — || align=right | 1.4 km || 
|-id=329 bgcolor=#d6d6d6
| 208329 ||  || — || August 16, 2001 || Socorro || LINEAR || — || align=right | 4.7 km || 
|-id=330 bgcolor=#d6d6d6
| 208330 ||  || — || August 16, 2001 || Socorro || LINEAR || — || align=right | 4.8 km || 
|-id=331 bgcolor=#d6d6d6
| 208331 ||  || — || August 18, 2001 || Socorro || LINEAR || EUP || align=right | 9.8 km || 
|-id=332 bgcolor=#d6d6d6
| 208332 ||  || — || August 22, 2001 || Socorro || LINEAR || — || align=right | 4.8 km || 
|-id=333 bgcolor=#d6d6d6
| 208333 ||  || — || August 22, 2001 || Socorro || LINEAR || — || align=right | 7.5 km || 
|-id=334 bgcolor=#d6d6d6
| 208334 ||  || — || August 21, 2001 || Kitt Peak || Spacewatch || — || align=right | 4.1 km || 
|-id=335 bgcolor=#d6d6d6
| 208335 ||  || — || August 23, 2001 || Anderson Mesa || LONEOS || — || align=right | 6.1 km || 
|-id=336 bgcolor=#d6d6d6
| 208336 ||  || — || August 23, 2001 || Anderson Mesa || LONEOS || KOR || align=right | 2.2 km || 
|-id=337 bgcolor=#E9E9E9
| 208337 ||  || — || August 23, 2001 || Anderson Mesa || LONEOS || — || align=right | 3.8 km || 
|-id=338 bgcolor=#d6d6d6
| 208338 ||  || — || August 23, 2001 || Kitt Peak || Spacewatch || — || align=right | 5.9 km || 
|-id=339 bgcolor=#d6d6d6
| 208339 ||  || — || August 24, 2001 || Anderson Mesa || LONEOS || — || align=right | 5.1 km || 
|-id=340 bgcolor=#d6d6d6
| 208340 ||  || — || August 24, 2001 || Anderson Mesa || LONEOS || — || align=right | 4.7 km || 
|-id=341 bgcolor=#d6d6d6
| 208341 ||  || — || August 24, 2001 || Socorro || LINEAR || TRP || align=right | 3.0 km || 
|-id=342 bgcolor=#d6d6d6
| 208342 ||  || — || August 24, 2001 || Socorro || LINEAR || — || align=right | 3.8 km || 
|-id=343 bgcolor=#d6d6d6
| 208343 ||  || — || August 24, 2001 || Socorro || LINEAR || EOS || align=right | 2.5 km || 
|-id=344 bgcolor=#E9E9E9
| 208344 ||  || — || August 25, 2001 || Anderson Mesa || LONEOS || — || align=right | 3.9 km || 
|-id=345 bgcolor=#d6d6d6
| 208345 ||  || — || August 26, 2001 || Palomar || NEAT || — || align=right | 3.6 km || 
|-id=346 bgcolor=#d6d6d6
| 208346 ||  || — || August 25, 2001 || Socorro || LINEAR || — || align=right | 3.8 km || 
|-id=347 bgcolor=#d6d6d6
| 208347 ||  || — || August 25, 2001 || Socorro || LINEAR || EUP || align=right | 7.4 km || 
|-id=348 bgcolor=#d6d6d6
| 208348 ||  || — || September 9, 2001 || Desert Eagle || W. K. Y. Yeung || EUP || align=right | 9.3 km || 
|-id=349 bgcolor=#d6d6d6
| 208349 ||  || — || September 11, 2001 || Badlands || Badlands Obs. || — || align=right | 3.6 km || 
|-id=350 bgcolor=#d6d6d6
| 208350 ||  || — || September 10, 2001 || Socorro || LINEAR || KOR || align=right | 1.9 km || 
|-id=351 bgcolor=#d6d6d6
| 208351 Sielmann ||  ||  || September 8, 2001 || Drebach || A. Knöfel || EUP || align=right | 8.5 km || 
|-id=352 bgcolor=#d6d6d6
| 208352 ||  || — || September 7, 2001 || Socorro || LINEAR || — || align=right | 3.5 km || 
|-id=353 bgcolor=#E9E9E9
| 208353 ||  || — || September 8, 2001 || Socorro || LINEAR || — || align=right | 2.1 km || 
|-id=354 bgcolor=#d6d6d6
| 208354 ||  || — || September 8, 2001 || Socorro || LINEAR || — || align=right | 5.2 km || 
|-id=355 bgcolor=#d6d6d6
| 208355 ||  || — || September 12, 2001 || Socorro || LINEAR || KOR || align=right | 2.5 km || 
|-id=356 bgcolor=#d6d6d6
| 208356 ||  || — || September 12, 2001 || Socorro || LINEAR || — || align=right | 4.9 km || 
|-id=357 bgcolor=#d6d6d6
| 208357 ||  || — || September 12, 2001 || Socorro || LINEAR || — || align=right | 4.5 km || 
|-id=358 bgcolor=#d6d6d6
| 208358 ||  || — || September 12, 2001 || Socorro || LINEAR || — || align=right | 3.1 km || 
|-id=359 bgcolor=#d6d6d6
| 208359 ||  || — || September 12, 2001 || Socorro || LINEAR || — || align=right | 4.6 km || 
|-id=360 bgcolor=#d6d6d6
| 208360 ||  || — || September 10, 2001 || Socorro || LINEAR || — || align=right | 3.7 km || 
|-id=361 bgcolor=#d6d6d6
| 208361 ||  || — || September 11, 2001 || Anderson Mesa || LONEOS || — || align=right | 4.1 km || 
|-id=362 bgcolor=#d6d6d6
| 208362 ||  || — || September 12, 2001 || Socorro || LINEAR || TIR || align=right | 5.7 km || 
|-id=363 bgcolor=#d6d6d6
| 208363 ||  || — || September 12, 2001 || Socorro || LINEAR || KOR || align=right | 2.1 km || 
|-id=364 bgcolor=#d6d6d6
| 208364 ||  || — || September 12, 2001 || Socorro || LINEAR || LIX || align=right | 5.7 km || 
|-id=365 bgcolor=#d6d6d6
| 208365 ||  || — || September 12, 2001 || Socorro || LINEAR || KOR || align=right | 2.4 km || 
|-id=366 bgcolor=#d6d6d6
| 208366 ||  || — || September 6, 2001 || Palomar || NEAT || — || align=right | 4.2 km || 
|-id=367 bgcolor=#d6d6d6
| 208367 ||  || — || September 11, 2001 || Anderson Mesa || LONEOS || EOS || align=right | 3.4 km || 
|-id=368 bgcolor=#d6d6d6
| 208368 ||  || — || September 12, 2001 || Socorro || LINEAR || — || align=right | 3.5 km || 
|-id=369 bgcolor=#d6d6d6
| 208369 ||  || — || September 18, 2001 || Kitt Peak || Spacewatch || — || align=right | 2.9 km || 
|-id=370 bgcolor=#d6d6d6
| 208370 ||  || — || September 16, 2001 || Socorro || LINEAR || EOS || align=right | 3.3 km || 
|-id=371 bgcolor=#d6d6d6
| 208371 ||  || — || September 16, 2001 || Socorro || LINEAR || — || align=right | 3.7 km || 
|-id=372 bgcolor=#d6d6d6
| 208372 ||  || — || September 16, 2001 || Socorro || LINEAR || — || align=right | 3.9 km || 
|-id=373 bgcolor=#d6d6d6
| 208373 ||  || — || September 16, 2001 || Socorro || LINEAR || — || align=right | 6.0 km || 
|-id=374 bgcolor=#d6d6d6
| 208374 ||  || — || September 16, 2001 || Socorro || LINEAR || URS || align=right | 5.3 km || 
|-id=375 bgcolor=#d6d6d6
| 208375 ||  || — || September 16, 2001 || Socorro || LINEAR || — || align=right | 5.4 km || 
|-id=376 bgcolor=#d6d6d6
| 208376 ||  || — || September 17, 2001 || Socorro || LINEAR || EOS || align=right | 3.5 km || 
|-id=377 bgcolor=#d6d6d6
| 208377 ||  || — || September 19, 2001 || Anderson Mesa || LONEOS || — || align=right | 3.9 km || 
|-id=378 bgcolor=#d6d6d6
| 208378 ||  || — || September 19, 2001 || Socorro || LINEAR || EOS || align=right | 2.7 km || 
|-id=379 bgcolor=#d6d6d6
| 208379 ||  || — || September 19, 2001 || Socorro || LINEAR || KOR || align=right | 2.4 km || 
|-id=380 bgcolor=#d6d6d6
| 208380 ||  || — || September 20, 2001 || Socorro || LINEAR || EOS || align=right | 2.9 km || 
|-id=381 bgcolor=#d6d6d6
| 208381 ||  || — || September 20, 2001 || Socorro || LINEAR || — || align=right | 4.6 km || 
|-id=382 bgcolor=#d6d6d6
| 208382 ||  || — || September 20, 2001 || Socorro || LINEAR || CHA || align=right | 2.7 km || 
|-id=383 bgcolor=#d6d6d6
| 208383 ||  || — || September 20, 2001 || Socorro || LINEAR || — || align=right | 3.3 km || 
|-id=384 bgcolor=#d6d6d6
| 208384 ||  || — || September 20, 2001 || Socorro || LINEAR || — || align=right | 3.9 km || 
|-id=385 bgcolor=#d6d6d6
| 208385 ||  || — || September 16, 2001 || Socorro || LINEAR || — || align=right | 6.4 km || 
|-id=386 bgcolor=#d6d6d6
| 208386 ||  || — || September 16, 2001 || Socorro || LINEAR || — || align=right | 4.5 km || 
|-id=387 bgcolor=#d6d6d6
| 208387 ||  || — || September 16, 2001 || Socorro || LINEAR || EOS || align=right | 3.2 km || 
|-id=388 bgcolor=#d6d6d6
| 208388 ||  || — || September 16, 2001 || Socorro || LINEAR || — || align=right | 3.4 km || 
|-id=389 bgcolor=#d6d6d6
| 208389 ||  || — || September 16, 2001 || Socorro || LINEAR || — || align=right | 3.1 km || 
|-id=390 bgcolor=#d6d6d6
| 208390 ||  || — || September 17, 2001 || Socorro || LINEAR || — || align=right | 5.0 km || 
|-id=391 bgcolor=#d6d6d6
| 208391 ||  || — || September 19, 2001 || Socorro || LINEAR || — || align=right | 3.8 km || 
|-id=392 bgcolor=#d6d6d6
| 208392 ||  || — || September 19, 2001 || Socorro || LINEAR || HYG || align=right | 3.8 km || 
|-id=393 bgcolor=#d6d6d6
| 208393 ||  || — || September 16, 2001 || Socorro || LINEAR || — || align=right | 3.0 km || 
|-id=394 bgcolor=#d6d6d6
| 208394 ||  || — || September 16, 2001 || Socorro || LINEAR || — || align=right | 4.4 km || 
|-id=395 bgcolor=#d6d6d6
| 208395 ||  || — || September 16, 2001 || Socorro || LINEAR || EOS || align=right | 2.6 km || 
|-id=396 bgcolor=#d6d6d6
| 208396 ||  || — || September 19, 2001 || Socorro || LINEAR || — || align=right | 3.1 km || 
|-id=397 bgcolor=#d6d6d6
| 208397 ||  || — || September 19, 2001 || Socorro || LINEAR || KOR || align=right | 2.0 km || 
|-id=398 bgcolor=#d6d6d6
| 208398 ||  || — || September 19, 2001 || Socorro || LINEAR || THM || align=right | 3.5 km || 
|-id=399 bgcolor=#d6d6d6
| 208399 ||  || — || September 19, 2001 || Socorro || LINEAR || — || align=right | 5.3 km || 
|-id=400 bgcolor=#d6d6d6
| 208400 ||  || — || September 19, 2001 || Socorro || LINEAR || KOR || align=right | 2.3 km || 
|}

208401–208500 

|-bgcolor=#E9E9E9
| 208401 ||  || — || September 19, 2001 || Socorro || LINEAR || — || align=right | 3.7 km || 
|-id=402 bgcolor=#d6d6d6
| 208402 ||  || — || September 19, 2001 || Socorro || LINEAR || TEL || align=right | 2.2 km || 
|-id=403 bgcolor=#d6d6d6
| 208403 ||  || — || September 19, 2001 || Socorro || LINEAR || — || align=right | 3.9 km || 
|-id=404 bgcolor=#d6d6d6
| 208404 ||  || — || September 19, 2001 || Socorro || LINEAR || — || align=right | 3.1 km || 
|-id=405 bgcolor=#d6d6d6
| 208405 ||  || — || September 19, 2001 || Socorro || LINEAR || — || align=right | 3.7 km || 
|-id=406 bgcolor=#d6d6d6
| 208406 ||  || — || September 19, 2001 || Socorro || LINEAR || — || align=right | 3.6 km || 
|-id=407 bgcolor=#d6d6d6
| 208407 ||  || — || September 19, 2001 || Socorro || LINEAR || KOR || align=right | 2.6 km || 
|-id=408 bgcolor=#d6d6d6
| 208408 ||  || — || September 19, 2001 || Socorro || LINEAR || — || align=right | 4.7 km || 
|-id=409 bgcolor=#d6d6d6
| 208409 ||  || — || September 19, 2001 || Socorro || LINEAR || EOS || align=right | 3.0 km || 
|-id=410 bgcolor=#d6d6d6
| 208410 ||  || — || September 19, 2001 || Socorro || LINEAR || EOS || align=right | 3.2 km || 
|-id=411 bgcolor=#d6d6d6
| 208411 ||  || — || September 19, 2001 || Socorro || LINEAR || — || align=right | 3.0 km || 
|-id=412 bgcolor=#d6d6d6
| 208412 ||  || — || September 19, 2001 || Socorro || LINEAR || — || align=right | 5.3 km || 
|-id=413 bgcolor=#E9E9E9
| 208413 ||  || — || September 19, 2001 || Kitt Peak || Spacewatch || GEF || align=right | 1.6 km || 
|-id=414 bgcolor=#d6d6d6
| 208414 ||  || — || September 20, 2001 || Kitt Peak || Spacewatch || THM || align=right | 2.9 km || 
|-id=415 bgcolor=#d6d6d6
| 208415 ||  || — || September 20, 2001 || Kitt Peak || Spacewatch || — || align=right | 2.7 km || 
|-id=416 bgcolor=#d6d6d6
| 208416 ||  || — || September 20, 2001 || Kitt Peak || Spacewatch || — || align=right | 3.2 km || 
|-id=417 bgcolor=#d6d6d6
| 208417 ||  || — || September 19, 2001 || Socorro || LINEAR || — || align=right | 3.8 km || 
|-id=418 bgcolor=#fefefe
| 208418 ||  || — || September 20, 2001 || Socorro || LINEAR || — || align=right data-sort-value="0.78" | 780 m || 
|-id=419 bgcolor=#d6d6d6
| 208419 ||  || — || September 20, 2001 || Socorro || LINEAR || — || align=right | 5.0 km || 
|-id=420 bgcolor=#d6d6d6
| 208420 ||  || — || September 16, 2001 || Socorro || LINEAR || — || align=right | 4.7 km || 
|-id=421 bgcolor=#d6d6d6
| 208421 ||  || — || September 19, 2001 || Kitt Peak || Spacewatch || — || align=right | 3.5 km || 
|-id=422 bgcolor=#d6d6d6
| 208422 ||  || — || September 21, 2001 || Anderson Mesa || LONEOS || 627 || align=right | 4.6 km || 
|-id=423 bgcolor=#d6d6d6
| 208423 ||  || — || September 21, 2001 || Palomar || NEAT || — || align=right | 3.8 km || 
|-id=424 bgcolor=#d6d6d6
| 208424 ||  || — || September 23, 2001 || Palomar || NEAT || EUP || align=right | 7.0 km || 
|-id=425 bgcolor=#d6d6d6
| 208425 Zehavi ||  ||  || September 18, 2001 || Apache Point || SDSS || EOS || align=right | 5.1 km || 
|-id=426 bgcolor=#d6d6d6
| 208426 ||  || — || September 25, 2001 || Palomar || NEAT || — || align=right | 4.4 km || 
|-id=427 bgcolor=#d6d6d6
| 208427 ||  || — || October 10, 2001 || Palomar || NEAT || EMA || align=right | 6.2 km || 
|-id=428 bgcolor=#d6d6d6
| 208428 ||  || — || October 11, 2001 || Socorro || LINEAR || — || align=right | 5.4 km || 
|-id=429 bgcolor=#d6d6d6
| 208429 ||  || — || October 14, 2001 || Cima Ekar || ADAS || — || align=right | 4.3 km || 
|-id=430 bgcolor=#fefefe
| 208430 ||  || — || October 13, 2001 || Socorro || LINEAR || — || align=right data-sort-value="0.95" | 950 m || 
|-id=431 bgcolor=#d6d6d6
| 208431 ||  || — || October 13, 2001 || Socorro || LINEAR || — || align=right | 3.6 km || 
|-id=432 bgcolor=#d6d6d6
| 208432 ||  || — || October 14, 2001 || Socorro || LINEAR || — || align=right | 3.3 km || 
|-id=433 bgcolor=#d6d6d6
| 208433 ||  || — || October 14, 2001 || Socorro || LINEAR || — || align=right | 5.3 km || 
|-id=434 bgcolor=#d6d6d6
| 208434 ||  || — || October 14, 2001 || Socorro || LINEAR || EMA || align=right | 5.7 km || 
|-id=435 bgcolor=#d6d6d6
| 208435 ||  || — || October 14, 2001 || Socorro || LINEAR || EOS || align=right | 3.3 km || 
|-id=436 bgcolor=#d6d6d6
| 208436 ||  || — || October 15, 2001 || Socorro || LINEAR || ANF || align=right | 2.4 km || 
|-id=437 bgcolor=#d6d6d6
| 208437 ||  || — || October 14, 2001 || Socorro || LINEAR || — || align=right | 4.0 km || 
|-id=438 bgcolor=#d6d6d6
| 208438 ||  || — || October 14, 2001 || Socorro || LINEAR || — || align=right | 5.2 km || 
|-id=439 bgcolor=#d6d6d6
| 208439 ||  || — || October 14, 2001 || Socorro || LINEAR || EOS || align=right | 4.3 km || 
|-id=440 bgcolor=#d6d6d6
| 208440 ||  || — || October 15, 2001 || Socorro || LINEAR || — || align=right | 4.2 km || 
|-id=441 bgcolor=#d6d6d6
| 208441 ||  || — || October 12, 2001 || Haleakala || NEAT || — || align=right | 3.7 km || 
|-id=442 bgcolor=#d6d6d6
| 208442 ||  || — || October 15, 2001 || Kitt Peak || Spacewatch || THM || align=right | 3.3 km || 
|-id=443 bgcolor=#d6d6d6
| 208443 ||  || — || October 11, 2001 || Palomar || NEAT || HYG || align=right | 3.3 km || 
|-id=444 bgcolor=#d6d6d6
| 208444 ||  || — || October 13, 2001 || Palomar || NEAT || EOS || align=right | 3.2 km || 
|-id=445 bgcolor=#d6d6d6
| 208445 ||  || — || October 14, 2001 || Palomar || NEAT || — || align=right | 6.6 km || 
|-id=446 bgcolor=#d6d6d6
| 208446 ||  || — || October 10, 2001 || Palomar || NEAT || — || align=right | 3.2 km || 
|-id=447 bgcolor=#d6d6d6
| 208447 ||  || — || October 10, 2001 || Palomar || NEAT || — || align=right | 4.8 km || 
|-id=448 bgcolor=#d6d6d6
| 208448 ||  || — || October 14, 2001 || Kitt Peak || Spacewatch || — || align=right | 3.9 km || 
|-id=449 bgcolor=#d6d6d6
| 208449 ||  || — || October 11, 2001 || Palomar || NEAT || — || align=right | 4.8 km || 
|-id=450 bgcolor=#d6d6d6
| 208450 ||  || — || October 11, 2001 || Palomar || NEAT || — || align=right | 4.1 km || 
|-id=451 bgcolor=#d6d6d6
| 208451 ||  || — || October 13, 2001 || Palomar || NEAT || — || align=right | 4.9 km || 
|-id=452 bgcolor=#d6d6d6
| 208452 ||  || — || October 15, 2001 || Haleakala || NEAT || MEL || align=right | 5.3 km || 
|-id=453 bgcolor=#d6d6d6
| 208453 ||  || — || October 13, 2001 || Socorro || LINEAR || VER || align=right | 6.9 km || 
|-id=454 bgcolor=#d6d6d6
| 208454 ||  || — || October 14, 2001 || Socorro || LINEAR || — || align=right | 4.4 km || 
|-id=455 bgcolor=#d6d6d6
| 208455 ||  || — || October 14, 2001 || Socorro || LINEAR || — || align=right | 4.3 km || 
|-id=456 bgcolor=#d6d6d6
| 208456 ||  || — || October 14, 2001 || Socorro || LINEAR || — || align=right | 4.0 km || 
|-id=457 bgcolor=#d6d6d6
| 208457 ||  || — || October 11, 2001 || Socorro || LINEAR || — || align=right | 5.9 km || 
|-id=458 bgcolor=#d6d6d6
| 208458 ||  || — || October 11, 2001 || Goodricke-Pigott || R. A. Tucker || EOS || align=right | 3.5 km || 
|-id=459 bgcolor=#d6d6d6
| 208459 ||  || — || October 13, 2001 || Palomar || NEAT || — || align=right | 4.8 km || 
|-id=460 bgcolor=#d6d6d6
| 208460 ||  || — || October 13, 2001 || Palomar || NEAT || EOS || align=right | 3.2 km || 
|-id=461 bgcolor=#d6d6d6
| 208461 ||  || — || October 12, 2001 || Palomar || NEAT || — || align=right | 3.6 km || 
|-id=462 bgcolor=#d6d6d6
| 208462 ||  || — || October 17, 2001 || Socorro || LINEAR || EOS || align=right | 3.5 km || 
|-id=463 bgcolor=#d6d6d6
| 208463 ||  || — || October 16, 2001 || Socorro || LINEAR || EUP || align=right | 5.6 km || 
|-id=464 bgcolor=#d6d6d6
| 208464 ||  || — || October 17, 2001 || Socorro || LINEAR || THM || align=right | 3.4 km || 
|-id=465 bgcolor=#d6d6d6
| 208465 ||  || — || October 17, 2001 || Kitt Peak || Spacewatch || THM || align=right | 2.9 km || 
|-id=466 bgcolor=#d6d6d6
| 208466 ||  || — || October 20, 2001 || Kitt Peak || Spacewatch || 628 || align=right | 2.7 km || 
|-id=467 bgcolor=#d6d6d6
| 208467 ||  || — || October 18, 2001 || Socorro || LINEAR || THM || align=right | 3.0 km || 
|-id=468 bgcolor=#d6d6d6
| 208468 ||  || — || October 16, 2001 || Kitt Peak || Spacewatch || HYG || align=right | 2.8 km || 
|-id=469 bgcolor=#fefefe
| 208469 ||  || — || October 18, 2001 || Palomar || NEAT || — || align=right data-sort-value="0.89" | 890 m || 
|-id=470 bgcolor=#d6d6d6
| 208470 ||  || — || October 17, 2001 || Socorro || LINEAR || THM || align=right | 3.5 km || 
|-id=471 bgcolor=#d6d6d6
| 208471 ||  || — || October 20, 2001 || Socorro || LINEAR || — || align=right | 4.0 km || 
|-id=472 bgcolor=#fefefe
| 208472 ||  || — || October 20, 2001 || Socorro || LINEAR || FLO || align=right | 1.2 km || 
|-id=473 bgcolor=#d6d6d6
| 208473 ||  || — || October 22, 2001 || Socorro || LINEAR || — || align=right | 5.6 km || 
|-id=474 bgcolor=#d6d6d6
| 208474 ||  || — || October 22, 2001 || Socorro || LINEAR || — || align=right | 3.9 km || 
|-id=475 bgcolor=#d6d6d6
| 208475 ||  || — || October 17, 2001 || Socorro || LINEAR || HYG || align=right | 4.4 km || 
|-id=476 bgcolor=#d6d6d6
| 208476 ||  || — || October 17, 2001 || Socorro || LINEAR || CRO || align=right | 5.6 km || 
|-id=477 bgcolor=#d6d6d6
| 208477 ||  || — || October 20, 2001 || Socorro || LINEAR || HYG || align=right | 3.6 km || 
|-id=478 bgcolor=#fefefe
| 208478 ||  || — || October 20, 2001 || Socorro || LINEAR || — || align=right | 1.4 km || 
|-id=479 bgcolor=#d6d6d6
| 208479 ||  || — || October 23, 2001 || Socorro || LINEAR || — || align=right | 3.7 km || 
|-id=480 bgcolor=#d6d6d6
| 208480 ||  || — || October 23, 2001 || Socorro || LINEAR || — || align=right | 3.6 km || 
|-id=481 bgcolor=#d6d6d6
| 208481 ||  || — || October 23, 2001 || Socorro || LINEAR || — || align=right | 5.2 km || 
|-id=482 bgcolor=#d6d6d6
| 208482 ||  || — || October 23, 2001 || Socorro || LINEAR || — || align=right | 5.8 km || 
|-id=483 bgcolor=#d6d6d6
| 208483 ||  || — || October 18, 2001 || Palomar || NEAT || HYG || align=right | 3.0 km || 
|-id=484 bgcolor=#d6d6d6
| 208484 ||  || — || October 18, 2001 || Palomar || NEAT || — || align=right | 5.0 km || 
|-id=485 bgcolor=#d6d6d6
| 208485 ||  || — || October 21, 2001 || Socorro || LINEAR || — || align=right | 4.5 km || 
|-id=486 bgcolor=#d6d6d6
| 208486 ||  || — || November 10, 2001 || Socorro || LINEAR || — || align=right | 4.8 km || 
|-id=487 bgcolor=#d6d6d6
| 208487 ||  || — || November 10, 2001 || Socorro || LINEAR || — || align=right | 5.1 km || 
|-id=488 bgcolor=#fefefe
| 208488 ||  || — || November 10, 2001 || Socorro || LINEAR || — || align=right | 1.2 km || 
|-id=489 bgcolor=#fefefe
| 208489 ||  || — || November 10, 2001 || Socorro || LINEAR || — || align=right | 1.4 km || 
|-id=490 bgcolor=#d6d6d6
| 208490 ||  || — || November 12, 2001 || Kitt Peak || Spacewatch || — || align=right | 4.8 km || 
|-id=491 bgcolor=#d6d6d6
| 208491 ||  || — || November 12, 2001 || Kitt Peak || Spacewatch || THM || align=right | 3.0 km || 
|-id=492 bgcolor=#fefefe
| 208492 ||  || — || November 11, 2001 || Kitt Peak || Spacewatch || — || align=right data-sort-value="0.74" | 740 m || 
|-id=493 bgcolor=#d6d6d6
| 208493 ||  || — || November 12, 2001 || Haleakala || NEAT || — || align=right | 5.1 km || 
|-id=494 bgcolor=#d6d6d6
| 208494 ||  || — || November 15, 2001 || Socorro || LINEAR || — || align=right | 5.9 km || 
|-id=495 bgcolor=#d6d6d6
| 208495 ||  || — || November 15, 2001 || Socorro || LINEAR || — || align=right | 6.5 km || 
|-id=496 bgcolor=#d6d6d6
| 208496 ||  || — || November 15, 2001 || Socorro || LINEAR || — || align=right | 5.0 km || 
|-id=497 bgcolor=#fefefe
| 208497 ||  || — || November 12, 2001 || Socorro || LINEAR || — || align=right data-sort-value="0.84" | 840 m || 
|-id=498 bgcolor=#fefefe
| 208498 ||  || — || November 12, 2001 || Socorro || LINEAR || — || align=right data-sort-value="0.98" | 980 m || 
|-id=499 bgcolor=#d6d6d6
| 208499 Shokasonjuku ||  ||  || November 17, 2001 || Kuma Kogen || A. Nakamura || — || align=right | 5.4 km || 
|-id=500 bgcolor=#d6d6d6
| 208500 ||  || — || November 17, 2001 || Socorro || LINEAR || — || align=right | 2.9 km || 
|}

208501–208600 

|-bgcolor=#d6d6d6
| 208501 ||  || — || November 17, 2001 || Socorro || LINEAR || — || align=right | 3.8 km || 
|-id=502 bgcolor=#d6d6d6
| 208502 ||  || — || November 17, 2001 || Socorro || LINEAR || EUP || align=right | 6.5 km || 
|-id=503 bgcolor=#fefefe
| 208503 ||  || — || November 20, 2001 || Socorro || LINEAR || — || align=right | 1.0 km || 
|-id=504 bgcolor=#fefefe
| 208504 ||  || — || November 20, 2001 || Socorro || LINEAR || — || align=right | 1.1 km || 
|-id=505 bgcolor=#d6d6d6
| 208505 ||  || — || November 21, 2001 || Socorro || LINEAR || — || align=right | 4.6 km || 
|-id=506 bgcolor=#fefefe
| 208506 ||  || — || November 21, 2001 || Socorro || LINEAR || — || align=right | 1.1 km || 
|-id=507 bgcolor=#fefefe
| 208507 || 2001 XO || — || December 6, 2001 || Socorro || LINEAR || — || align=right | 3.1 km || 
|-id=508 bgcolor=#d6d6d6
| 208508 ||  || — || December 9, 2001 || Socorro || LINEAR || — || align=right | 4.7 km || 
|-id=509 bgcolor=#fefefe
| 208509 ||  || — || December 10, 2001 || Socorro || LINEAR || — || align=right | 1.0 km || 
|-id=510 bgcolor=#fefefe
| 208510 ||  || — || December 10, 2001 || Socorro || LINEAR || — || align=right | 1.2 km || 
|-id=511 bgcolor=#d6d6d6
| 208511 ||  || — || December 10, 2001 || Socorro || LINEAR || — || align=right | 4.1 km || 
|-id=512 bgcolor=#fefefe
| 208512 ||  || — || December 10, 2001 || Socorro || LINEAR || — || align=right | 1.2 km || 
|-id=513 bgcolor=#fefefe
| 208513 ||  || — || December 10, 2001 || Socorro || LINEAR || — || align=right data-sort-value="0.94" | 940 m || 
|-id=514 bgcolor=#fefefe
| 208514 ||  || — || December 13, 2001 || Socorro || LINEAR || — || align=right | 1.5 km || 
|-id=515 bgcolor=#fefefe
| 208515 ||  || — || December 14, 2001 || Socorro || LINEAR || — || align=right data-sort-value="0.96" | 960 m || 
|-id=516 bgcolor=#d6d6d6
| 208516 ||  || — || December 14, 2001 || Socorro || LINEAR || — || align=right | 3.5 km || 
|-id=517 bgcolor=#d6d6d6
| 208517 ||  || — || December 14, 2001 || Socorro || LINEAR || 7:4 || align=right | 3.5 km || 
|-id=518 bgcolor=#fefefe
| 208518 ||  || — || December 14, 2001 || Socorro || LINEAR || FLO || align=right | 2.5 km || 
|-id=519 bgcolor=#fefefe
| 208519 ||  || — || December 14, 2001 || Socorro || LINEAR || PHO || align=right | 1.5 km || 
|-id=520 bgcolor=#fefefe
| 208520 ||  || — || December 14, 2001 || Socorro || LINEAR || — || align=right | 1.3 km || 
|-id=521 bgcolor=#fefefe
| 208521 ||  || — || December 14, 2001 || Socorro || LINEAR || — || align=right | 1.4 km || 
|-id=522 bgcolor=#fefefe
| 208522 ||  || — || December 11, 2001 || Socorro || LINEAR || — || align=right | 1.0 km || 
|-id=523 bgcolor=#fefefe
| 208523 ||  || — || December 11, 2001 || Socorro || LINEAR || — || align=right | 1.2 km || 
|-id=524 bgcolor=#fefefe
| 208524 ||  || — || December 15, 2001 || Socorro || LINEAR || — || align=right data-sort-value="0.94" | 940 m || 
|-id=525 bgcolor=#d6d6d6
| 208525 ||  || — || December 15, 2001 || Socorro || LINEAR || — || align=right | 5.4 km || 
|-id=526 bgcolor=#d6d6d6
| 208526 ||  || — || December 15, 2001 || Socorro || LINEAR || — || align=right | 4.3 km || 
|-id=527 bgcolor=#fefefe
| 208527 ||  || — || December 15, 2001 || Cima Ekar || ADAS || PHO || align=right | 1.5 km || 
|-id=528 bgcolor=#fefefe
| 208528 ||  || — || December 18, 2001 || Socorro || LINEAR || FLO || align=right data-sort-value="0.97" | 970 m || 
|-id=529 bgcolor=#fefefe
| 208529 ||  || — || December 18, 2001 || Socorro || LINEAR || — || align=right data-sort-value="0.86" | 860 m || 
|-id=530 bgcolor=#fefefe
| 208530 ||  || — || December 18, 2001 || Socorro || LINEAR || — || align=right | 1.2 km || 
|-id=531 bgcolor=#fefefe
| 208531 ||  || — || December 17, 2001 || Socorro || LINEAR || — || align=right | 2.1 km || 
|-id=532 bgcolor=#fefefe
| 208532 ||  || — || December 17, 2001 || Socorro || LINEAR || — || align=right data-sort-value="0.89" | 890 m || 
|-id=533 bgcolor=#fefefe
| 208533 ||  || — || December 17, 2001 || Socorro || LINEAR || — || align=right data-sort-value="0.96" | 960 m || 
|-id=534 bgcolor=#fefefe
| 208534 ||  || — || December 17, 2001 || Socorro || LINEAR || — || align=right | 1.3 km || 
|-id=535 bgcolor=#fefefe
| 208535 ||  || — || December 17, 2001 || Socorro || LINEAR || — || align=right | 1.1 km || 
|-id=536 bgcolor=#d6d6d6
| 208536 ||  || — || December 19, 2001 || Socorro || LINEAR || EUP || align=right | 7.9 km || 
|-id=537 bgcolor=#fefefe
| 208537 ||  || — || December 19, 2001 || Palomar || NEAT || — || align=right | 1.4 km || 
|-id=538 bgcolor=#fefefe
| 208538 ||  || — || January 9, 2002 || Bohyunsan || Bohyunsan Obs. || — || align=right data-sort-value="0.59" | 590 m || 
|-id=539 bgcolor=#fefefe
| 208539 ||  || — || January 11, 2002 || Desert Eagle || W. K. Y. Yeung || FLO || align=right | 1.1 km || 
|-id=540 bgcolor=#fefefe
| 208540 ||  || — || January 9, 2002 || Socorro || LINEAR || FLO || align=right | 1.1 km || 
|-id=541 bgcolor=#fefefe
| 208541 ||  || — || January 9, 2002 || Socorro || LINEAR || — || align=right | 1.3 km || 
|-id=542 bgcolor=#d6d6d6
| 208542 ||  || — || January 12, 2002 || Socorro || LINEAR || — || align=right | 4.5 km || 
|-id=543 bgcolor=#fefefe
| 208543 ||  || — || January 9, 2002 || Socorro || LINEAR || V || align=right data-sort-value="0.98" | 980 m || 
|-id=544 bgcolor=#fefefe
| 208544 ||  || — || January 12, 2002 || Cerro Tololo || DLS || — || align=right | 1.3 km || 
|-id=545 bgcolor=#fefefe
| 208545 ||  || — || January 8, 2002 || Socorro || LINEAR || — || align=right | 1.0 km || 
|-id=546 bgcolor=#fefefe
| 208546 ||  || — || January 9, 2002 || Socorro || LINEAR || — || align=right | 1.4 km || 
|-id=547 bgcolor=#fefefe
| 208547 ||  || — || January 9, 2002 || Socorro || LINEAR || PHO || align=right | 3.2 km || 
|-id=548 bgcolor=#fefefe
| 208548 ||  || — || January 9, 2002 || Socorro || LINEAR || — || align=right | 1.1 km || 
|-id=549 bgcolor=#fefefe
| 208549 ||  || — || January 9, 2002 || Socorro || LINEAR || FLO || align=right data-sort-value="0.91" | 910 m || 
|-id=550 bgcolor=#fefefe
| 208550 ||  || — || January 9, 2002 || Socorro || LINEAR || — || align=right | 1.3 km || 
|-id=551 bgcolor=#fefefe
| 208551 ||  || — || January 12, 2002 || Socorro || LINEAR || V || align=right data-sort-value="0.88" | 880 m || 
|-id=552 bgcolor=#fefefe
| 208552 ||  || — || January 13, 2002 || Socorro || LINEAR || FLO || align=right data-sort-value="0.82" | 820 m || 
|-id=553 bgcolor=#fefefe
| 208553 ||  || — || January 13, 2002 || Socorro || LINEAR || — || align=right | 1.4 km || 
|-id=554 bgcolor=#fefefe
| 208554 ||  || — || January 14, 2002 || Socorro || LINEAR || FLO || align=right | 1.1 km || 
|-id=555 bgcolor=#fefefe
| 208555 ||  || — || January 14, 2002 || Socorro || LINEAR || FLO || align=right | 1.1 km || 
|-id=556 bgcolor=#fefefe
| 208556 ||  || — || January 14, 2002 || Socorro || LINEAR || MAS || align=right | 1.2 km || 
|-id=557 bgcolor=#fefefe
| 208557 ||  || — || January 7, 2002 || Palomar || NEAT || — || align=right | 1.1 km || 
|-id=558 bgcolor=#fefefe
| 208558 ||  || — || January 8, 2002 || Socorro || LINEAR || — || align=right | 1.1 km || 
|-id=559 bgcolor=#fefefe
| 208559 ||  || — || January 13, 2002 || Socorro || LINEAR || — || align=right | 1.1 km || 
|-id=560 bgcolor=#d6d6d6
| 208560 ||  || — || January 13, 2002 || Apache Point || SDSS || — || align=right | 5.0 km || 
|-id=561 bgcolor=#fefefe
| 208561 ||  || — || January 22, 2002 || Socorro || LINEAR || PHO || align=right | 1.7 km || 
|-id=562 bgcolor=#fefefe
| 208562 ||  || — || January 20, 2002 || Anderson Mesa || LONEOS || — || align=right | 1.5 km || 
|-id=563 bgcolor=#FA8072
| 208563 ||  || — || February 7, 2002 || Socorro || LINEAR || — || align=right | 1.2 km || 
|-id=564 bgcolor=#fefefe
| 208564 ||  || — || February 6, 2002 || Socorro || LINEAR || — || align=right | 2.0 km || 
|-id=565 bgcolor=#FFC2E0
| 208565 ||  || — || February 6, 2002 || Socorro || LINEAR || APO +1km || align=right | 1.4 km || 
|-id=566 bgcolor=#fefefe
| 208566 ||  || — || February 4, 2002 || Palomar || NEAT || — || align=right | 1.4 km || 
|-id=567 bgcolor=#fefefe
| 208567 ||  || — || February 4, 2002 || Haleakala || NEAT || — || align=right | 1.1 km || 
|-id=568 bgcolor=#fefefe
| 208568 ||  || — || February 5, 2002 || Palomar || NEAT || MAS || align=right | 1.1 km || 
|-id=569 bgcolor=#fefefe
| 208569 ||  || — || February 5, 2002 || Haleakala || NEAT || — || align=right | 1.2 km || 
|-id=570 bgcolor=#fefefe
| 208570 ||  || — || February 6, 2002 || Palomar || NEAT || — || align=right | 1.2 km || 
|-id=571 bgcolor=#fefefe
| 208571 ||  || — || February 6, 2002 || Haleakala || NEAT || — || align=right | 1.5 km || 
|-id=572 bgcolor=#fefefe
| 208572 ||  || — || February 6, 2002 || Socorro || LINEAR || NYS || align=right data-sort-value="0.79" | 790 m || 
|-id=573 bgcolor=#fefefe
| 208573 ||  || — || February 6, 2002 || Socorro || LINEAR || — || align=right | 1.1 km || 
|-id=574 bgcolor=#fefefe
| 208574 ||  || — || February 6, 2002 || Socorro || LINEAR || FLO || align=right | 1.1 km || 
|-id=575 bgcolor=#fefefe
| 208575 ||  || — || February 6, 2002 || Socorro || LINEAR || FLO || align=right | 1.0 km || 
|-id=576 bgcolor=#fefefe
| 208576 ||  || — || February 6, 2002 || Socorro || LINEAR || — || align=right | 1.2 km || 
|-id=577 bgcolor=#fefefe
| 208577 ||  || — || February 7, 2002 || Socorro || LINEAR || — || align=right | 1.3 km || 
|-id=578 bgcolor=#fefefe
| 208578 ||  || — || February 7, 2002 || Socorro || LINEAR || — || align=right | 2.3 km || 
|-id=579 bgcolor=#fefefe
| 208579 ||  || — || February 7, 2002 || Socorro || LINEAR || — || align=right | 1.3 km || 
|-id=580 bgcolor=#fefefe
| 208580 ||  || — || February 7, 2002 || Socorro || LINEAR || FLO || align=right | 1.0 km || 
|-id=581 bgcolor=#fefefe
| 208581 ||  || — || February 7, 2002 || Socorro || LINEAR || — || align=right | 1.4 km || 
|-id=582 bgcolor=#fefefe
| 208582 ||  || — || February 7, 2002 || Socorro || LINEAR || NYS || align=right data-sort-value="0.87" | 870 m || 
|-id=583 bgcolor=#fefefe
| 208583 ||  || — || February 7, 2002 || Socorro || LINEAR || NYS || align=right data-sort-value="0.73" | 730 m || 
|-id=584 bgcolor=#fefefe
| 208584 ||  || — || February 7, 2002 || Socorro || LINEAR || — || align=right data-sort-value="0.88" | 880 m || 
|-id=585 bgcolor=#fefefe
| 208585 ||  || — || February 7, 2002 || Socorro || LINEAR || — || align=right | 1.2 km || 
|-id=586 bgcolor=#fefefe
| 208586 ||  || — || February 8, 2002 || Socorro || LINEAR || — || align=right | 1.6 km || 
|-id=587 bgcolor=#fefefe
| 208587 ||  || — || February 8, 2002 || Socorro || LINEAR || NYS || align=right | 3.2 km || 
|-id=588 bgcolor=#fefefe
| 208588 ||  || — || February 10, 2002 || Socorro || LINEAR || PHO || align=right | 1.6 km || 
|-id=589 bgcolor=#fefefe
| 208589 ||  || — || February 12, 2002 || Desert Eagle || W. K. Y. Yeung || V || align=right data-sort-value="0.98" | 980 m || 
|-id=590 bgcolor=#fefefe
| 208590 ||  || — || February 7, 2002 || Socorro || LINEAR || — || align=right | 1.0 km || 
|-id=591 bgcolor=#fefefe
| 208591 ||  || — || February 7, 2002 || Socorro || LINEAR || — || align=right | 1.3 km || 
|-id=592 bgcolor=#fefefe
| 208592 ||  || — || February 8, 2002 || Socorro || LINEAR || — || align=right | 1.1 km || 
|-id=593 bgcolor=#fefefe
| 208593 ||  || — || February 8, 2002 || Socorro || LINEAR || — || align=right | 1.1 km || 
|-id=594 bgcolor=#fefefe
| 208594 ||  || — || February 8, 2002 || Socorro || LINEAR || NYS || align=right data-sort-value="0.78" | 780 m || 
|-id=595 bgcolor=#fefefe
| 208595 ||  || — || February 8, 2002 || Socorro || LINEAR || — || align=right | 3.5 km || 
|-id=596 bgcolor=#fefefe
| 208596 ||  || — || February 9, 2002 || Socorro || LINEAR || — || align=right | 1.1 km || 
|-id=597 bgcolor=#fefefe
| 208597 ||  || — || February 7, 2002 || Socorro || LINEAR || NYS || align=right | 1.0 km || 
|-id=598 bgcolor=#fefefe
| 208598 ||  || — || February 7, 2002 || Socorro || LINEAR || FLO || align=right | 1.3 km || 
|-id=599 bgcolor=#fefefe
| 208599 ||  || — || February 8, 2002 || Socorro || LINEAR || FLO || align=right | 1.1 km || 
|-id=600 bgcolor=#fefefe
| 208600 ||  || — || February 8, 2002 || Socorro || LINEAR || — || align=right | 1.1 km || 
|}

208601–208700 

|-bgcolor=#fefefe
| 208601 ||  || — || February 10, 2002 || Socorro || LINEAR || FLO || align=right data-sort-value="0.91" | 910 m || 
|-id=602 bgcolor=#fefefe
| 208602 ||  || — || February 10, 2002 || Socorro || LINEAR || — || align=right data-sort-value="0.98" | 980 m || 
|-id=603 bgcolor=#fefefe
| 208603 ||  || — || February 10, 2002 || Socorro || LINEAR || — || align=right data-sort-value="0.96" | 960 m || 
|-id=604 bgcolor=#fefefe
| 208604 ||  || — || February 10, 2002 || Socorro || LINEAR || — || align=right | 1.0 km || 
|-id=605 bgcolor=#fefefe
| 208605 ||  || — || February 10, 2002 || Socorro || LINEAR || NYS || align=right data-sort-value="0.72" | 720 m || 
|-id=606 bgcolor=#fefefe
| 208606 ||  || — || February 10, 2002 || Socorro || LINEAR || V || align=right | 1.1 km || 
|-id=607 bgcolor=#fefefe
| 208607 ||  || — || February 11, 2002 || Socorro || LINEAR || FLO || align=right data-sort-value="0.89" | 890 m || 
|-id=608 bgcolor=#fefefe
| 208608 ||  || — || February 8, 2002 || Socorro || LINEAR || FLO || align=right data-sort-value="0.88" | 880 m || 
|-id=609 bgcolor=#fefefe
| 208609 ||  || — || February 11, 2002 || Socorro || LINEAR || — || align=right | 1.2 km || 
|-id=610 bgcolor=#fefefe
| 208610 ||  || — || February 4, 2002 || Cima Ekar || ADAS || — || align=right | 1.00 km || 
|-id=611 bgcolor=#fefefe
| 208611 ||  || — || February 4, 2002 || Palomar || NEAT || — || align=right | 1.2 km || 
|-id=612 bgcolor=#fefefe
| 208612 ||  || — || February 4, 2002 || Palomar || NEAT || NYS || align=right data-sort-value="0.86" | 860 m || 
|-id=613 bgcolor=#fefefe
| 208613 ||  || — || February 6, 2002 || Anderson Mesa || LONEOS || — || align=right | 1.3 km || 
|-id=614 bgcolor=#fefefe
| 208614 ||  || — || February 7, 2002 || Kitt Peak || Spacewatch || V || align=right data-sort-value="0.92" | 920 m || 
|-id=615 bgcolor=#fefefe
| 208615 ||  || — || February 20, 2002 || Kitt Peak || Spacewatch || NYS || align=right data-sort-value="0.65" | 650 m || 
|-id=616 bgcolor=#fefefe
| 208616 ||  || — || February 16, 2002 || Palomar || NEAT || FLO || align=right | 1.6 km || 
|-id=617 bgcolor=#FFC2E0
| 208617 ||  || — || March 9, 2002 || Socorro || LINEAR || APO +1km || align=right data-sort-value="0.99" | 990 m || 
|-id=618 bgcolor=#fefefe
| 208618 ||  || — || March 10, 2002 || Cima Ekar || ADAS || — || align=right | 1.1 km || 
|-id=619 bgcolor=#fefefe
| 208619 ||  || — || March 3, 2002 || Haleakala || NEAT || ERI || align=right | 2.8 km || 
|-id=620 bgcolor=#fefefe
| 208620 ||  || — || March 9, 2002 || Socorro || LINEAR || V || align=right | 1.0 km || 
|-id=621 bgcolor=#fefefe
| 208621 ||  || — || March 12, 2002 || Socorro || LINEAR || — || align=right | 1.1 km || 
|-id=622 bgcolor=#fefefe
| 208622 ||  || — || March 12, 2002 || Palomar || NEAT || — || align=right | 1.4 km || 
|-id=623 bgcolor=#fefefe
| 208623 ||  || — || March 12, 2002 || Palomar || NEAT || — || align=right | 1.1 km || 
|-id=624 bgcolor=#fefefe
| 208624 ||  || — || March 12, 2002 || Palomar || NEAT || NYS || align=right data-sort-value="0.77" | 770 m || 
|-id=625 bgcolor=#fefefe
| 208625 ||  || — || March 13, 2002 || Socorro || LINEAR || — || align=right | 1.4 km || 
|-id=626 bgcolor=#fefefe
| 208626 ||  || — || March 13, 2002 || Socorro || LINEAR || NYS || align=right | 2.0 km || 
|-id=627 bgcolor=#fefefe
| 208627 ||  || — || March 13, 2002 || Socorro || LINEAR || FLO || align=right | 1.1 km || 
|-id=628 bgcolor=#fefefe
| 208628 ||  || — || March 12, 2002 || Palomar || NEAT || V || align=right data-sort-value="0.98" | 980 m || 
|-id=629 bgcolor=#fefefe
| 208629 ||  || — || March 9, 2002 || Socorro || LINEAR || — || align=right data-sort-value="0.92" | 920 m || 
|-id=630 bgcolor=#fefefe
| 208630 ||  || — || March 9, 2002 || Socorro || LINEAR || — || align=right | 1.3 km || 
|-id=631 bgcolor=#fefefe
| 208631 ||  || — || March 9, 2002 || Socorro || LINEAR || V || align=right | 1.3 km || 
|-id=632 bgcolor=#fefefe
| 208632 ||  || — || March 9, 2002 || Socorro || LINEAR || NYS || align=right data-sort-value="0.90" | 900 m || 
|-id=633 bgcolor=#fefefe
| 208633 ||  || — || March 12, 2002 || Socorro || LINEAR || — || align=right data-sort-value="0.77" | 770 m || 
|-id=634 bgcolor=#fefefe
| 208634 ||  || — || March 12, 2002 || Socorro || LINEAR || — || align=right | 1.4 km || 
|-id=635 bgcolor=#fefefe
| 208635 ||  || — || March 13, 2002 || Socorro || LINEAR || NYS || align=right | 1.6 km || 
|-id=636 bgcolor=#fefefe
| 208636 ||  || — || March 13, 2002 || Socorro || LINEAR || V || align=right | 1.00 km || 
|-id=637 bgcolor=#fefefe
| 208637 ||  || — || March 15, 2002 || Socorro || LINEAR || — || align=right | 1.3 km || 
|-id=638 bgcolor=#fefefe
| 208638 ||  || — || March 5, 2002 || Kitt Peak || Spacewatch || NYS || align=right | 1.0 km || 
|-id=639 bgcolor=#fefefe
| 208639 ||  || — || March 5, 2002 || Haleakala || NEAT || FLO || align=right | 1.1 km || 
|-id=640 bgcolor=#fefefe
| 208640 ||  || — || March 9, 2002 || Palomar || NEAT || V || align=right | 1.1 km || 
|-id=641 bgcolor=#fefefe
| 208641 ||  || — || March 9, 2002 || Anderson Mesa || LONEOS || PHO || align=right | 1.9 km || 
|-id=642 bgcolor=#fefefe
| 208642 ||  || — || March 9, 2002 || Anderson Mesa || LONEOS || KLI || align=right | 3.3 km || 
|-id=643 bgcolor=#fefefe
| 208643 ||  || — || March 9, 2002 || Anderson Mesa || LONEOS || — || align=right | 1.5 km || 
|-id=644 bgcolor=#fefefe
| 208644 ||  || — || March 9, 2002 || Palomar || NEAT || V || align=right data-sort-value="0.89" | 890 m || 
|-id=645 bgcolor=#fefefe
| 208645 ||  || — || March 9, 2002 || Catalina || CSS || — || align=right | 1.4 km || 
|-id=646 bgcolor=#fefefe
| 208646 ||  || — || March 9, 2002 || Anderson Mesa || LONEOS || — || align=right | 1.3 km || 
|-id=647 bgcolor=#fefefe
| 208647 ||  || — || March 10, 2002 || Kitt Peak || Spacewatch || NYS || align=right | 1.9 km || 
|-id=648 bgcolor=#fefefe
| 208648 ||  || — || March 12, 2002 || Palomar || NEAT || FLO || align=right data-sort-value="0.77" | 770 m || 
|-id=649 bgcolor=#fefefe
| 208649 ||  || — || March 12, 2002 || Kitt Peak || Spacewatch || NYS || align=right data-sort-value="0.61" | 610 m || 
|-id=650 bgcolor=#fefefe
| 208650 ||  || — || March 13, 2002 || Palomar || NEAT || NYS || align=right data-sort-value="0.90" | 900 m || 
|-id=651 bgcolor=#fefefe
| 208651 ||  || — || March 15, 2002 || Kitt Peak || Spacewatch || — || align=right | 1.5 km || 
|-id=652 bgcolor=#fefefe
| 208652 ||  || — || March 9, 2002 || Socorro || LINEAR || — || align=right | 2.8 km || 
|-id=653 bgcolor=#fefefe
| 208653 ||  || — || March 20, 2002 || Desert Eagle || W. K. Y. Yeung || KLI || align=right | 3.1 km || 
|-id=654 bgcolor=#fefefe
| 208654 ||  || — || March 16, 2002 || Socorro || LINEAR || — || align=right | 1.8 km || 
|-id=655 bgcolor=#fefefe
| 208655 ||  || — || March 16, 2002 || Socorro || LINEAR || — || align=right | 1.1 km || 
|-id=656 bgcolor=#fefefe
| 208656 ||  || — || March 16, 2002 || Socorro || LINEAR || V || align=right | 1.0 km || 
|-id=657 bgcolor=#fefefe
| 208657 ||  || — || March 16, 2002 || Haleakala || NEAT || — || align=right | 1.4 km || 
|-id=658 bgcolor=#fefefe
| 208658 ||  || — || March 17, 2002 || Haleakala || NEAT || — || align=right | 1.3 km || 
|-id=659 bgcolor=#fefefe
| 208659 ||  || — || March 19, 2002 || Anderson Mesa || LONEOS || — || align=right | 1.3 km || 
|-id=660 bgcolor=#fefefe
| 208660 ||  || — || March 19, 2002 || Anderson Mesa || LONEOS || — || align=right | 1.2 km || 
|-id=661 bgcolor=#FA8072
| 208661 ||  || — || April 9, 2002 || Palomar || NEAT || PHO || align=right | 1.0 km || 
|-id=662 bgcolor=#fefefe
| 208662 ||  || — || April 13, 2002 || Palomar || NEAT || PHO || align=right | 2.4 km || 
|-id=663 bgcolor=#fefefe
| 208663 ||  || — || April 12, 2002 || Desert Eagle || W. K. Y. Yeung || PHO || align=right | 2.1 km || 
|-id=664 bgcolor=#fefefe
| 208664 ||  || — || April 14, 2002 || Desert Eagle || W. K. Y. Yeung || — || align=right | 1.5 km || 
|-id=665 bgcolor=#fefefe
| 208665 ||  || — || April 15, 2002 || Kitt Peak || Spacewatch || — || align=right | 1.7 km || 
|-id=666 bgcolor=#fefefe
| 208666 ||  || — || April 15, 2002 || Socorro || LINEAR || FLO || align=right | 2.0 km || 
|-id=667 bgcolor=#fefefe
| 208667 ||  || — || April 15, 2002 || Socorro || LINEAR || NYS || align=right | 3.4 km || 
|-id=668 bgcolor=#fefefe
| 208668 ||  || — || April 14, 2002 || Socorro || LINEAR || NYS || align=right data-sort-value="0.99" | 990 m || 
|-id=669 bgcolor=#fefefe
| 208669 ||  || — || April 3, 2002 || Kitt Peak || Spacewatch || — || align=right | 1.6 km || 
|-id=670 bgcolor=#fefefe
| 208670 ||  || — || April 4, 2002 || Kitt Peak || Spacewatch || — || align=right | 1.0 km || 
|-id=671 bgcolor=#fefefe
| 208671 ||  || — || April 4, 2002 || Palomar || NEAT || — || align=right | 1.3 km || 
|-id=672 bgcolor=#fefefe
| 208672 ||  || — || April 8, 2002 || Palomar || NEAT || — || align=right | 1.1 km || 
|-id=673 bgcolor=#fefefe
| 208673 ||  || — || April 8, 2002 || Palomar || NEAT || — || align=right | 2.8 km || 
|-id=674 bgcolor=#fefefe
| 208674 ||  || — || April 10, 2002 || Socorro || LINEAR || — || align=right | 1.2 km || 
|-id=675 bgcolor=#fefefe
| 208675 ||  || — || April 10, 2002 || Socorro || LINEAR || ERI || align=right | 2.6 km || 
|-id=676 bgcolor=#fefefe
| 208676 ||  || — || April 10, 2002 || Socorro || LINEAR || — || align=right | 1.2 km || 
|-id=677 bgcolor=#fefefe
| 208677 ||  || — || April 8, 2002 || Kitt Peak || Spacewatch || NYS || align=right data-sort-value="0.78" | 780 m || 
|-id=678 bgcolor=#fefefe
| 208678 ||  || — || April 9, 2002 || Socorro || LINEAR || — || align=right | 2.3 km || 
|-id=679 bgcolor=#fefefe
| 208679 ||  || — || April 9, 2002 || Socorro || LINEAR || — || align=right | 1.2 km || 
|-id=680 bgcolor=#fefefe
| 208680 ||  || — || April 9, 2002 || Socorro || LINEAR || V || align=right data-sort-value="0.99" | 990 m || 
|-id=681 bgcolor=#fefefe
| 208681 ||  || — || April 9, 2002 || Kitt Peak || Spacewatch || — || align=right | 1.3 km || 
|-id=682 bgcolor=#fefefe
| 208682 ||  || — || April 11, 2002 || Anderson Mesa || LONEOS || — || align=right | 1.4 km || 
|-id=683 bgcolor=#fefefe
| 208683 ||  || — || April 10, 2002 || Socorro || LINEAR || — || align=right | 1.4 km || 
|-id=684 bgcolor=#fefefe
| 208684 ||  || — || April 11, 2002 || Anderson Mesa || LONEOS || — || align=right | 1.3 km || 
|-id=685 bgcolor=#fefefe
| 208685 ||  || — || April 12, 2002 || Palomar || NEAT || MAS || align=right | 1.1 km || 
|-id=686 bgcolor=#fefefe
| 208686 ||  || — || April 12, 2002 || Palomar || NEAT || — || align=right | 1.1 km || 
|-id=687 bgcolor=#fefefe
| 208687 ||  || — || April 12, 2002 || Socorro || LINEAR || FLO || align=right | 3.1 km || 
|-id=688 bgcolor=#fefefe
| 208688 ||  || — || April 13, 2002 || Palomar || NEAT || NYS || align=right data-sort-value="0.84" | 840 m || 
|-id=689 bgcolor=#fefefe
| 208689 ||  || — || April 13, 2002 || Palomar || NEAT || MAS || align=right data-sort-value="0.93" | 930 m || 
|-id=690 bgcolor=#fefefe
| 208690 ||  || — || April 14, 2002 || Socorro || LINEAR || — || align=right | 1.0 km || 
|-id=691 bgcolor=#fefefe
| 208691 ||  || — || April 14, 2002 || Palomar || NEAT || V || align=right | 1.2 km || 
|-id=692 bgcolor=#fefefe
| 208692 ||  || — || April 14, 2002 || Kitt Peak || Spacewatch || NYS || align=right data-sort-value="0.81" | 810 m || 
|-id=693 bgcolor=#fefefe
| 208693 ||  || — || April 14, 2002 || Palomar || NEAT || NYS || align=right | 1.2 km || 
|-id=694 bgcolor=#fefefe
| 208694 ||  || — || April 11, 2002 || Socorro || LINEAR || NYS || align=right | 1.0 km || 
|-id=695 bgcolor=#d6d6d6
| 208695 ||  || — || April 12, 2002 || Palomar || NEAT || 3:2 || align=right | 10 km || 
|-id=696 bgcolor=#fefefe
| 208696 ||  || — || April 16, 2002 || Socorro || LINEAR || V || align=right | 1.2 km || 
|-id=697 bgcolor=#fefefe
| 208697 ||  || — || April 16, 2002 || Socorro || LINEAR || KLI || align=right | 3.4 km || 
|-id=698 bgcolor=#fefefe
| 208698 ||  || — || April 16, 2002 || Socorro || LINEAR || V || align=right | 1.1 km || 
|-id=699 bgcolor=#fefefe
| 208699 ||  || — || April 16, 2002 || Socorro || LINEAR || ERI || align=right | 3.5 km || 
|-id=700 bgcolor=#fefefe
| 208700 || 2002 JK || — || May 3, 2002 || Desert Eagle || W. K. Y. Yeung || — || align=right | 1.7 km || 
|}

208701–208800 

|-bgcolor=#fefefe
| 208701 ||  || — || May 6, 2002 || Palomar || NEAT || — || align=right | 1.7 km || 
|-id=702 bgcolor=#fefefe
| 208702 ||  || — || May 8, 2002 || Socorro || LINEAR || — || align=right | 1.0 km || 
|-id=703 bgcolor=#fefefe
| 208703 ||  || — || May 8, 2002 || Socorro || LINEAR || — || align=right | 1.2 km || 
|-id=704 bgcolor=#fefefe
| 208704 ||  || — || May 9, 2002 || Socorro || LINEAR || V || align=right | 1.1 km || 
|-id=705 bgcolor=#fefefe
| 208705 ||  || — || May 9, 2002 || Socorro || LINEAR || NYS || align=right | 1.1 km || 
|-id=706 bgcolor=#fefefe
| 208706 ||  || — || May 8, 2002 || Socorro || LINEAR || — || align=right | 1.3 km || 
|-id=707 bgcolor=#fefefe
| 208707 ||  || — || May 9, 2002 || Socorro || LINEAR || NYS || align=right | 1.3 km || 
|-id=708 bgcolor=#fefefe
| 208708 ||  || — || May 9, 2002 || Socorro || LINEAR || MAS || align=right | 1.1 km || 
|-id=709 bgcolor=#fefefe
| 208709 ||  || — || May 8, 2002 || Socorro || LINEAR || MAS || align=right | 1.5 km || 
|-id=710 bgcolor=#fefefe
| 208710 ||  || — || May 7, 2002 || Socorro || LINEAR || — || align=right | 1.5 km || 
|-id=711 bgcolor=#fefefe
| 208711 ||  || — || May 8, 2002 || Socorro || LINEAR || PHO || align=right | 1.8 km || 
|-id=712 bgcolor=#fefefe
| 208712 ||  || — || May 11, 2002 || Socorro || LINEAR || V || align=right | 1.1 km || 
|-id=713 bgcolor=#fefefe
| 208713 ||  || — || May 11, 2002 || Socorro || LINEAR || NYS || align=right | 1.1 km || 
|-id=714 bgcolor=#fefefe
| 208714 ||  || — || May 11, 2002 || Socorro || LINEAR || NYS || align=right | 1.1 km || 
|-id=715 bgcolor=#fefefe
| 208715 ||  || — || May 11, 2002 || Socorro || LINEAR || NYS || align=right data-sort-value="0.97" | 970 m || 
|-id=716 bgcolor=#fefefe
| 208716 ||  || — || May 11, 2002 || Socorro || LINEAR || NYS || align=right | 1.1 km || 
|-id=717 bgcolor=#fefefe
| 208717 ||  || — || May 10, 2002 || Socorro || LINEAR || MAS || align=right | 1.2 km || 
|-id=718 bgcolor=#fefefe
| 208718 ||  || — || May 12, 2002 || Socorro || LINEAR || NYS || align=right | 1.1 km || 
|-id=719 bgcolor=#fefefe
| 208719 ||  || — || May 14, 2002 || Palomar || NEAT || MAS || align=right | 1.0 km || 
|-id=720 bgcolor=#fefefe
| 208720 ||  || — || May 13, 2002 || Socorro || LINEAR || — || align=right | 1.7 km || 
|-id=721 bgcolor=#fefefe
| 208721 ||  || — || May 4, 2002 || Anderson Mesa || LONEOS || — || align=right | 1.8 km || 
|-id=722 bgcolor=#fefefe
| 208722 ||  || — || May 5, 2002 || Palomar || NEAT || — || align=right | 1.7 km || 
|-id=723 bgcolor=#fefefe
| 208723 ||  || — || May 8, 2002 || Socorro || LINEAR || — || align=right | 1.4 km || 
|-id=724 bgcolor=#fefefe
| 208724 ||  || — || May 8, 2002 || Kitt Peak || Spacewatch || CLA || align=right | 2.2 km || 
|-id=725 bgcolor=#fefefe
| 208725 ||  || — || May 11, 2002 || Socorro || LINEAR || NYS || align=right | 2.0 km || 
|-id=726 bgcolor=#fefefe
| 208726 ||  || — || May 18, 2002 || Palomar || NEAT || MAS || align=right data-sort-value="0.91" | 910 m || 
|-id=727 bgcolor=#fefefe
| 208727 ||  || — || May 18, 2002 || Socorro || LINEAR || PHO || align=right | 1.7 km || 
|-id=728 bgcolor=#fefefe
| 208728 ||  || — || June 2, 2002 || Palomar || NEAT || — || align=right | 1.2 km || 
|-id=729 bgcolor=#fefefe
| 208729 ||  || — || June 5, 2002 || Socorro || LINEAR || V || align=right | 1.2 km || 
|-id=730 bgcolor=#fefefe
| 208730 ||  || — || June 6, 2002 || Socorro || LINEAR || — || align=right | 1.2 km || 
|-id=731 bgcolor=#E9E9E9
| 208731 ||  || — || June 9, 2002 || Haleakala || NEAT || — || align=right | 1.6 km || 
|-id=732 bgcolor=#fefefe
| 208732 ||  || — || June 3, 2002 || Palomar || NEAT || — || align=right | 1.5 km || 
|-id=733 bgcolor=#E9E9E9
| 208733 ||  || — || June 7, 2002 || Haleakala || NEAT || — || align=right | 4.4 km || 
|-id=734 bgcolor=#E9E9E9
| 208734 ||  || — || July 4, 2002 || Palomar || NEAT || — || align=right | 3.6 km || 
|-id=735 bgcolor=#fefefe
| 208735 ||  || — || July 13, 2002 || Socorro || LINEAR || H || align=right | 1.1 km || 
|-id=736 bgcolor=#E9E9E9
| 208736 ||  || — || July 9, 2002 || Socorro || LINEAR || — || align=right | 1.9 km || 
|-id=737 bgcolor=#E9E9E9
| 208737 ||  || — || July 9, 2002 || Socorro || LINEAR || — || align=right | 2.0 km || 
|-id=738 bgcolor=#d6d6d6
| 208738 ||  || — || July 9, 2002 || Socorro || LINEAR || — || align=right | 3.9 km || 
|-id=739 bgcolor=#E9E9E9
| 208739 ||  || — || July 5, 2002 || Socorro || LINEAR || — || align=right | 1.6 km || 
|-id=740 bgcolor=#E9E9E9
| 208740 ||  || — || July 14, 2002 || Palomar || NEAT || — || align=right | 1.8 km || 
|-id=741 bgcolor=#E9E9E9
| 208741 ||  || — || July 9, 2002 || Socorro || LINEAR || GAL || align=right | 2.8 km || 
|-id=742 bgcolor=#E9E9E9
| 208742 ||  || — || July 11, 2002 || Campo Imperatore || CINEOS || — || align=right | 2.1 km || 
|-id=743 bgcolor=#E9E9E9
| 208743 ||  || — || July 14, 2002 || Palomar || NEAT || — || align=right | 1.8 km || 
|-id=744 bgcolor=#E9E9E9
| 208744 ||  || — || July 9, 2002 || Socorro || LINEAR || — || align=right | 1.4 km || 
|-id=745 bgcolor=#E9E9E9
| 208745 ||  || — || July 14, 2002 || Palomar || NEAT || — || align=right | 1.1 km || 
|-id=746 bgcolor=#E9E9E9
| 208746 ||  || — || July 8, 2002 || Palomar || NEAT || — || align=right | 2.2 km || 
|-id=747 bgcolor=#E9E9E9
| 208747 ||  || — || July 3, 2002 || Palomar || NEAT || — || align=right | 5.9 km || 
|-id=748 bgcolor=#E9E9E9
| 208748 ||  || — || July 5, 2002 || Palomar || NEAT || — || align=right | 1.2 km || 
|-id=749 bgcolor=#E9E9E9
| 208749 ||  || — || July 16, 2002 || Bergisch Gladbach || W. Bickel || — || align=right | 2.7 km || 
|-id=750 bgcolor=#E9E9E9
| 208750 ||  || — || July 20, 2002 || Palomar || NEAT || KRM || align=right | 3.1 km || 
|-id=751 bgcolor=#E9E9E9
| 208751 ||  || — || July 18, 2002 || Socorro || LINEAR || — || align=right | 4.6 km || 
|-id=752 bgcolor=#E9E9E9
| 208752 ||  || — || August 4, 2002 || Palomar || NEAT || — || align=right | 2.1 km || 
|-id=753 bgcolor=#E9E9E9
| 208753 ||  || — || August 4, 2002 || Palomar || NEAT || — || align=right | 3.0 km || 
|-id=754 bgcolor=#fefefe
| 208754 ||  || — || August 4, 2002 || Palomar || NEAT || H || align=right data-sort-value="0.72" | 720 m || 
|-id=755 bgcolor=#E9E9E9
| 208755 ||  || — || August 6, 2002 || Palomar || NEAT || — || align=right | 1.3 km || 
|-id=756 bgcolor=#E9E9E9
| 208756 ||  || — || August 6, 2002 || Palomar || NEAT || — || align=right | 2.0 km || 
|-id=757 bgcolor=#fefefe
| 208757 ||  || — || August 4, 2002 || Socorro || LINEAR || H || align=right | 1.2 km || 
|-id=758 bgcolor=#E9E9E9
| 208758 ||  || — || August 10, 2002 || Socorro || LINEAR || POS || align=right | 6.2 km || 
|-id=759 bgcolor=#E9E9E9
| 208759 ||  || — || August 10, 2002 || Socorro || LINEAR || — || align=right | 2.9 km || 
|-id=760 bgcolor=#E9E9E9
| 208760 ||  || — || August 8, 2002 || Palomar || NEAT || — || align=right | 1.8 km || 
|-id=761 bgcolor=#fefefe
| 208761 ||  || — || August 3, 2002 || Palomar || NEAT || NYS || align=right | 2.1 km || 
|-id=762 bgcolor=#E9E9E9
| 208762 ||  || — || August 5, 2002 || Palomar || NEAT || — || align=right | 2.5 km || 
|-id=763 bgcolor=#E9E9E9
| 208763 ||  || — || August 12, 2002 || Socorro || LINEAR || — || align=right | 2.7 km || 
|-id=764 bgcolor=#E9E9E9
| 208764 ||  || — || August 13, 2002 || Tenagra || Tenagra Obs. || — || align=right | 3.4 km || 
|-id=765 bgcolor=#fefefe
| 208765 ||  || — || August 13, 2002 || Socorro || LINEAR || H || align=right data-sort-value="0.89" | 890 m || 
|-id=766 bgcolor=#d6d6d6
| 208766 ||  || — || August 12, 2002 || Socorro || LINEAR || BRA || align=right | 1.7 km || 
|-id=767 bgcolor=#E9E9E9
| 208767 ||  || — || August 13, 2002 || Socorro || LINEAR || — || align=right | 2.0 km || 
|-id=768 bgcolor=#E9E9E9
| 208768 ||  || — || August 13, 2002 || Socorro || LINEAR || — || align=right | 2.7 km || 
|-id=769 bgcolor=#E9E9E9
| 208769 ||  || — || August 14, 2002 || Socorro || LINEAR || MAR || align=right | 1.5 km || 
|-id=770 bgcolor=#E9E9E9
| 208770 ||  || — || August 13, 2002 || Anderson Mesa || LONEOS || MAR || align=right | 2.4 km || 
|-id=771 bgcolor=#E9E9E9
| 208771 ||  || — || August 14, 2002 || Socorro || LINEAR || — || align=right | 3.6 km || 
|-id=772 bgcolor=#E9E9E9
| 208772 ||  || — || August 14, 2002 || Socorro || LINEAR || — || align=right | 2.8 km || 
|-id=773 bgcolor=#E9E9E9
| 208773 ||  || — || August 15, 2002 || Socorro || LINEAR || — || align=right | 2.1 km || 
|-id=774 bgcolor=#E9E9E9
| 208774 ||  || — || August 14, 2002 || Socorro || LINEAR || — || align=right | 1.9 km || 
|-id=775 bgcolor=#fefefe
| 208775 ||  || — || August 14, 2002 || Socorro || LINEAR || H || align=right data-sort-value="0.97" | 970 m || 
|-id=776 bgcolor=#E9E9E9
| 208776 ||  || — || August 8, 2002 || Palomar || S. F. Hönig || — || align=right | 2.6 km || 
|-id=777 bgcolor=#E9E9E9
| 208777 ||  || — || August 8, 2002 || Palomar || A. Lowe || — || align=right | 1.7 km || 
|-id=778 bgcolor=#E9E9E9
| 208778 ||  || — || August 8, 2002 || Palomar || NEAT || — || align=right | 2.3 km || 
|-id=779 bgcolor=#E9E9E9
| 208779 ||  || — || August 8, 2002 || Palomar || NEAT || — || align=right | 1.2 km || 
|-id=780 bgcolor=#E9E9E9
| 208780 ||  || — || August 15, 2002 || Palomar || NEAT || — || align=right | 1.2 km || 
|-id=781 bgcolor=#E9E9E9
| 208781 ||  || — || August 16, 2002 || Haleakala || NEAT || — || align=right | 2.2 km || 
|-id=782 bgcolor=#E9E9E9
| 208782 ||  || — || August 19, 2002 || Palomar || NEAT || — || align=right | 3.2 km || 
|-id=783 bgcolor=#E9E9E9
| 208783 ||  || — || August 20, 2002 || Palomar || NEAT || — || align=right | 2.5 km || 
|-id=784 bgcolor=#E9E9E9
| 208784 ||  || — || August 17, 2002 || Palomar || NEAT || BRU || align=right | 4.9 km || 
|-id=785 bgcolor=#E9E9E9
| 208785 ||  || — || August 26, 2002 || Palomar || NEAT || — || align=right | 2.0 km || 
|-id=786 bgcolor=#E9E9E9
| 208786 ||  || — || August 29, 2002 || Palomar || NEAT || — || align=right | 2.3 km || 
|-id=787 bgcolor=#E9E9E9
| 208787 ||  || — || August 29, 2002 || Palomar || NEAT || — || align=right | 1.3 km || 
|-id=788 bgcolor=#E9E9E9
| 208788 ||  || — || August 28, 2002 || Palomar || NEAT || — || align=right | 2.4 km || 
|-id=789 bgcolor=#E9E9E9
| 208789 ||  || — || August 30, 2002 || Kitt Peak || Spacewatch || — || align=right | 2.9 km || 
|-id=790 bgcolor=#E9E9E9
| 208790 ||  || — || August 30, 2002 || Palomar || NEAT || — || align=right | 3.5 km || 
|-id=791 bgcolor=#E9E9E9
| 208791 ||  || — || August 29, 2002 || Palomar || R. Matson || — || align=right | 2.6 km || 
|-id=792 bgcolor=#E9E9E9
| 208792 ||  || — || August 17, 2002 || Palomar || NEAT || — || align=right | 2.7 km || 
|-id=793 bgcolor=#E9E9E9
| 208793 ||  || — || August 17, 2002 || Palomar || NEAT || — || align=right | 1.0 km || 
|-id=794 bgcolor=#E9E9E9
| 208794 ||  || — || August 27, 2002 || Palomar || NEAT || — || align=right | 2.7 km || 
|-id=795 bgcolor=#E9E9E9
| 208795 ||  || — || August 18, 2002 || Palomar || NEAT || — || align=right | 1.6 km || 
|-id=796 bgcolor=#E9E9E9
| 208796 ||  || — || August 18, 2002 || Palomar || NEAT || — || align=right | 1.8 km || 
|-id=797 bgcolor=#E9E9E9
| 208797 ||  || — || August 28, 2002 || Palomar || NEAT || — || align=right | 1.3 km || 
|-id=798 bgcolor=#E9E9E9
| 208798 ||  || — || August 29, 2002 || Palomar || NEAT || — || align=right | 2.6 km || 
|-id=799 bgcolor=#E9E9E9
| 208799 ||  || — || August 27, 2002 || Palomar || NEAT || — || align=right | 2.0 km || 
|-id=800 bgcolor=#E9E9E9
| 208800 ||  || — || August 18, 2002 || Palomar || NEAT || HEN || align=right | 1.4 km || 
|}

208801–208900 

|-bgcolor=#E9E9E9
| 208801 ||  || — || August 30, 2002 || Palomar || NEAT || — || align=right | 4.5 km || 
|-id=802 bgcolor=#E9E9E9
| 208802 ||  || — || August 30, 2002 || Palomar || NEAT || WIT || align=right | 1.4 km || 
|-id=803 bgcolor=#E9E9E9
| 208803 ||  || — || August 17, 2002 || Palomar || NEAT || — || align=right | 1.4 km || 
|-id=804 bgcolor=#E9E9E9
| 208804 ||  || — || August 29, 2002 || Palomar || NEAT || — || align=right | 1.9 km || 
|-id=805 bgcolor=#E9E9E9
| 208805 ||  || — || August 18, 2002 || Palomar || NEAT || — || align=right | 1.9 km || 
|-id=806 bgcolor=#E9E9E9
| 208806 ||  || — || August 29, 2002 || Palomar || NEAT || — || align=right | 1.5 km || 
|-id=807 bgcolor=#E9E9E9
| 208807 ||  || — || August 29, 2002 || Palomar || NEAT || — || align=right | 1.8 km || 
|-id=808 bgcolor=#E9E9E9
| 208808 ||  || — || August 16, 2002 || Palomar || NEAT || MAR || align=right | 1.5 km || 
|-id=809 bgcolor=#E9E9E9
| 208809 ||  || — || August 17, 2002 || Palomar || NEAT || — || align=right | 1.7 km || 
|-id=810 bgcolor=#d6d6d6
| 208810 ||  || — || August 18, 2002 || Palomar || NEAT || — || align=right | 2.7 km || 
|-id=811 bgcolor=#E9E9E9
| 208811 || 2002 RQ || — || September 3, 2002 || Ondřejov || P. Kušnirák || — || align=right | 3.8 km || 
|-id=812 bgcolor=#E9E9E9
| 208812 ||  || — || September 4, 2002 || Anderson Mesa || LONEOS || MIS || align=right | 3.3 km || 
|-id=813 bgcolor=#E9E9E9
| 208813 ||  || — || September 1, 2002 || Haleakala || NEAT || — || align=right | 1.6 km || 
|-id=814 bgcolor=#E9E9E9
| 208814 ||  || — || September 3, 2002 || Haleakala || NEAT || — || align=right | 1.5 km || 
|-id=815 bgcolor=#fefefe
| 208815 ||  || — || September 4, 2002 || Palomar || NEAT || MAS || align=right | 1.3 km || 
|-id=816 bgcolor=#E9E9E9
| 208816 ||  || — || September 4, 2002 || Anderson Mesa || LONEOS || — || align=right | 3.2 km || 
|-id=817 bgcolor=#E9E9E9
| 208817 ||  || — || September 4, 2002 || Anderson Mesa || LONEOS || MAR || align=right | 1.5 km || 
|-id=818 bgcolor=#E9E9E9
| 208818 ||  || — || September 4, 2002 || Anderson Mesa || LONEOS || AER || align=right | 2.4 km || 
|-id=819 bgcolor=#E9E9E9
| 208819 ||  || — || September 4, 2002 || Anderson Mesa || LONEOS || GEF || align=right | 2.0 km || 
|-id=820 bgcolor=#E9E9E9
| 208820 ||  || — || September 4, 2002 || Anderson Mesa || LONEOS || — || align=right | 2.8 km || 
|-id=821 bgcolor=#E9E9E9
| 208821 ||  || — || September 4, 2002 || Anderson Mesa || LONEOS || — || align=right | 4.7 km || 
|-id=822 bgcolor=#fefefe
| 208822 ||  || — || September 5, 2002 || Socorro || LINEAR || H || align=right data-sort-value="0.78" | 780 m || 
|-id=823 bgcolor=#FA8072
| 208823 ||  || — || September 4, 2002 || Palomar || NEAT || — || align=right data-sort-value="0.80" | 800 m || 
|-id=824 bgcolor=#E9E9E9
| 208824 ||  || — || September 5, 2002 || Socorro || LINEAR || — || align=right | 2.9 km || 
|-id=825 bgcolor=#fefefe
| 208825 ||  || — || September 5, 2002 || Socorro || LINEAR || — || align=right | 1.5 km || 
|-id=826 bgcolor=#E9E9E9
| 208826 ||  || — || September 5, 2002 || Socorro || LINEAR || — || align=right | 2.9 km || 
|-id=827 bgcolor=#E9E9E9
| 208827 ||  || — || September 5, 2002 || Socorro || LINEAR || EUN || align=right | 1.8 km || 
|-id=828 bgcolor=#E9E9E9
| 208828 ||  || — || September 5, 2002 || Socorro || LINEAR || — || align=right | 3.6 km || 
|-id=829 bgcolor=#E9E9E9
| 208829 ||  || — || September 5, 2002 || Socorro || LINEAR || — || align=right | 2.0 km || 
|-id=830 bgcolor=#E9E9E9
| 208830 ||  || — || September 5, 2002 || Anderson Mesa || LONEOS || — || align=right | 2.3 km || 
|-id=831 bgcolor=#E9E9E9
| 208831 ||  || — || September 4, 2002 || Anderson Mesa || LONEOS || — || align=right | 3.5 km || 
|-id=832 bgcolor=#E9E9E9
| 208832 ||  || — || September 5, 2002 || Socorro || LINEAR || — || align=right | 2.1 km || 
|-id=833 bgcolor=#E9E9E9
| 208833 ||  || — || September 5, 2002 || Socorro || LINEAR || GAL || align=right | 2.4 km || 
|-id=834 bgcolor=#E9E9E9
| 208834 ||  || — || September 5, 2002 || Socorro || LINEAR || EUN || align=right | 2.0 km || 
|-id=835 bgcolor=#E9E9E9
| 208835 ||  || — || September 8, 2002 || Haleakala || NEAT || — || align=right | 3.4 km || 
|-id=836 bgcolor=#d6d6d6
| 208836 ||  || — || September 11, 2002 || Palomar || NEAT || — || align=right | 5.7 km || 
|-id=837 bgcolor=#E9E9E9
| 208837 ||  || — || September 10, 2002 || Haleakala || NEAT || — || align=right | 2.8 km || 
|-id=838 bgcolor=#E9E9E9
| 208838 ||  || — || September 11, 2002 || Palomar || NEAT || — || align=right | 2.6 km || 
|-id=839 bgcolor=#E9E9E9
| 208839 ||  || — || September 11, 2002 || Palomar || NEAT || — || align=right | 2.4 km || 
|-id=840 bgcolor=#E9E9E9
| 208840 ||  || — || September 11, 2002 || Palomar || NEAT || WIT || align=right | 1.3 km || 
|-id=841 bgcolor=#E9E9E9
| 208841 ||  || — || September 11, 2002 || Palomar || NEAT || — || align=right | 3.1 km || 
|-id=842 bgcolor=#E9E9E9
| 208842 ||  || — || September 13, 2002 || Palomar || NEAT || AEO || align=right | 1.5 km || 
|-id=843 bgcolor=#E9E9E9
| 208843 ||  || — || September 13, 2002 || Palomar || NEAT || MAR || align=right | 2.3 km || 
|-id=844 bgcolor=#E9E9E9
| 208844 ||  || — || September 13, 2002 || Kitt Peak || Spacewatch || INO || align=right | 1.7 km || 
|-id=845 bgcolor=#E9E9E9
| 208845 ||  || — || September 13, 2002 || Palomar || NEAT || — || align=right | 1.7 km || 
|-id=846 bgcolor=#E9E9E9
| 208846 ||  || — || September 13, 2002 || Palomar || NEAT || PAD || align=right | 4.0 km || 
|-id=847 bgcolor=#E9E9E9
| 208847 ||  || — || September 12, 2002 || Palomar || NEAT || — || align=right | 2.6 km || 
|-id=848 bgcolor=#d6d6d6
| 208848 ||  || — || September 12, 2002 || Palomar || NEAT || — || align=right | 3.3 km || 
|-id=849 bgcolor=#E9E9E9
| 208849 ||  || — || September 14, 2002 || Haleakala || NEAT || — || align=right | 1.8 km || 
|-id=850 bgcolor=#E9E9E9
| 208850 ||  || — || September 14, 2002 || Haleakala || NEAT || HNS || align=right | 1.8 km || 
|-id=851 bgcolor=#E9E9E9
| 208851 ||  || — || September 15, 2002 || Palomar || NEAT || — || align=right | 2.7 km || 
|-id=852 bgcolor=#E9E9E9
| 208852 ||  || — || September 14, 2002 || Palomar || NEAT || — || align=right | 2.1 km || 
|-id=853 bgcolor=#E9E9E9
| 208853 ||  || — || September 15, 2002 || Palomar || NEAT || XIZ || align=right | 1.9 km || 
|-id=854 bgcolor=#E9E9E9
| 208854 ||  || — || September 4, 2002 || Palomar || NEAT || — || align=right | 1.3 km || 
|-id=855 bgcolor=#E9E9E9
| 208855 ||  || — || September 4, 2002 || Palomar || NEAT || HNA || align=right | 2.5 km || 
|-id=856 bgcolor=#E9E9E9
| 208856 ||  || — || September 27, 2002 || Palomar || NEAT || HEN || align=right | 1.7 km || 
|-id=857 bgcolor=#E9E9E9
| 208857 ||  || — || September 27, 2002 || Palomar || NEAT || — || align=right | 3.2 km || 
|-id=858 bgcolor=#E9E9E9
| 208858 ||  || — || September 26, 2002 || Palomar || NEAT || — || align=right | 3.4 km || 
|-id=859 bgcolor=#E9E9E9
| 208859 ||  || — || September 27, 2002 || Palomar || NEAT || — || align=right | 3.1 km || 
|-id=860 bgcolor=#E9E9E9
| 208860 ||  || — || September 29, 2002 || Haleakala || NEAT || — || align=right | 3.5 km || 
|-id=861 bgcolor=#E9E9E9
| 208861 ||  || — || September 28, 2002 || Haleakala || NEAT || — || align=right | 4.6 km || 
|-id=862 bgcolor=#E9E9E9
| 208862 ||  || — || September 30, 2002 || Socorro || LINEAR || WIT || align=right | 1.5 km || 
|-id=863 bgcolor=#E9E9E9
| 208863 ||  || — || September 28, 2002 || Haleakala || NEAT || — || align=right | 3.1 km || 
|-id=864 bgcolor=#E9E9E9
| 208864 ||  || — || September 30, 2002 || Socorro || LINEAR || — || align=right | 3.0 km || 
|-id=865 bgcolor=#E9E9E9
| 208865 ||  || — || September 16, 2002 || Palomar || R. Matson || AGN || align=right | 1.8 km || 
|-id=866 bgcolor=#E9E9E9
| 208866 ||  || — || September 16, 2002 || Palomar || NEAT || — || align=right | 1.7 km || 
|-id=867 bgcolor=#E9E9E9
| 208867 ||  || — || October 1, 2002 || Anderson Mesa || LONEOS || MRX || align=right | 1.8 km || 
|-id=868 bgcolor=#d6d6d6
| 208868 ||  || — || October 1, 2002 || Socorro || LINEAR || — || align=right | 3.8 km || 
|-id=869 bgcolor=#E9E9E9
| 208869 ||  || — || October 1, 2002 || Anderson Mesa || LONEOS || NEM || align=right | 3.4 km || 
|-id=870 bgcolor=#E9E9E9
| 208870 ||  || — || October 1, 2002 || Haleakala || NEAT || PAD || align=right | 2.1 km || 
|-id=871 bgcolor=#E9E9E9
| 208871 ||  || — || October 2, 2002 || Socorro || LINEAR || — || align=right | 3.0 km || 
|-id=872 bgcolor=#E9E9E9
| 208872 ||  || — || October 2, 2002 || Socorro || LINEAR || — || align=right | 4.3 km || 
|-id=873 bgcolor=#d6d6d6
| 208873 ||  || — || October 2, 2002 || Socorro || LINEAR || 615 || align=right | 1.8 km || 
|-id=874 bgcolor=#fefefe
| 208874 ||  || — || October 2, 2002 || Socorro || LINEAR || H || align=right data-sort-value="0.89" | 890 m || 
|-id=875 bgcolor=#E9E9E9
| 208875 ||  || — || October 2, 2002 || Socorro || LINEAR || — || align=right | 4.3 km || 
|-id=876 bgcolor=#E9E9E9
| 208876 ||  || — || October 2, 2002 || Haleakala || NEAT || — || align=right | 2.3 km || 
|-id=877 bgcolor=#E9E9E9
| 208877 ||  || — || October 2, 2002 || Haleakala || NEAT || NEM || align=right | 3.5 km || 
|-id=878 bgcolor=#E9E9E9
| 208878 ||  || — || October 2, 2002 || Haleakala || NEAT || — || align=right | 3.1 km || 
|-id=879 bgcolor=#FA8072
| 208879 ||  || — || October 4, 2002 || Socorro || LINEAR || — || align=right | 1.5 km || 
|-id=880 bgcolor=#d6d6d6
| 208880 ||  || — || October 4, 2002 || Socorro || LINEAR || — || align=right | 4.7 km || 
|-id=881 bgcolor=#E9E9E9
| 208881 ||  || — || October 3, 2002 || Palomar || NEAT || — || align=right | 1.8 km || 
|-id=882 bgcolor=#E9E9E9
| 208882 ||  || — || October 1, 2002 || Anderson Mesa || LONEOS || — || align=right | 1.5 km || 
|-id=883 bgcolor=#E9E9E9
| 208883 ||  || — || October 2, 2002 || Campo Imperatore || CINEOS || — || align=right | 1.6 km || 
|-id=884 bgcolor=#E9E9E9
| 208884 ||  || — || October 3, 2002 || Palomar || NEAT || — || align=right | 1.9 km || 
|-id=885 bgcolor=#d6d6d6
| 208885 ||  || — || October 3, 2002 || Socorro || LINEAR || KOR || align=right | 2.0 km || 
|-id=886 bgcolor=#E9E9E9
| 208886 ||  || — || October 3, 2002 || Socorro || LINEAR || HOF || align=right | 3.9 km || 
|-id=887 bgcolor=#E9E9E9
| 208887 ||  || — || October 3, 2002 || Palomar || NEAT || — || align=right | 3.2 km || 
|-id=888 bgcolor=#E9E9E9
| 208888 ||  || — || October 3, 2002 || Socorro || LINEAR || — || align=right | 2.9 km || 
|-id=889 bgcolor=#E9E9E9
| 208889 ||  || — || October 4, 2002 || Socorro || LINEAR || — || align=right | 2.2 km || 
|-id=890 bgcolor=#E9E9E9
| 208890 ||  || — || October 3, 2002 || Socorro || LINEAR || — || align=right | 3.9 km || 
|-id=891 bgcolor=#E9E9E9
| 208891 ||  || — || October 3, 2002 || Palomar || NEAT || — || align=right | 5.1 km || 
|-id=892 bgcolor=#E9E9E9
| 208892 ||  || — || October 3, 2002 || Palomar || NEAT || — || align=right | 4.3 km || 
|-id=893 bgcolor=#E9E9E9
| 208893 ||  || — || October 3, 2002 || Palomar || NEAT || — || align=right | 2.9 km || 
|-id=894 bgcolor=#E9E9E9
| 208894 ||  || — || October 3, 2002 || Palomar || NEAT || — || align=right | 4.7 km || 
|-id=895 bgcolor=#E9E9E9
| 208895 ||  || — || October 4, 2002 || Socorro || LINEAR || — || align=right | 1.8 km || 
|-id=896 bgcolor=#E9E9E9
| 208896 ||  || — || October 4, 2002 || Anderson Mesa || LONEOS || — || align=right | 3.7 km || 
|-id=897 bgcolor=#fefefe
| 208897 ||  || — || October 3, 2002 || Socorro || LINEAR || H || align=right data-sort-value="0.74" | 740 m || 
|-id=898 bgcolor=#E9E9E9
| 208898 ||  || — || October 5, 2002 || Palomar || NEAT || — || align=right | 3.8 km || 
|-id=899 bgcolor=#E9E9E9
| 208899 ||  || — || October 5, 2002 || Palomar || NEAT || WIT || align=right | 1.5 km || 
|-id=900 bgcolor=#d6d6d6
| 208900 ||  || — || October 5, 2002 || Palomar || NEAT || — || align=right | 2.6 km || 
|}

208901–209000 

|-bgcolor=#E9E9E9
| 208901 ||  || — || October 5, 2002 || Palomar || NEAT || — || align=right | 4.1 km || 
|-id=902 bgcolor=#E9E9E9
| 208902 ||  || — || October 5, 2002 || Palomar || NEAT || MIT || align=right | 3.8 km || 
|-id=903 bgcolor=#d6d6d6
| 208903 ||  || — || October 5, 2002 || Palomar || NEAT || — || align=right | 3.8 km || 
|-id=904 bgcolor=#fefefe
| 208904 ||  || — || October 3, 2002 || Palomar || NEAT || H || align=right | 1.1 km || 
|-id=905 bgcolor=#E9E9E9
| 208905 ||  || — || October 9, 2002 || Bergisch Gladbach || W. Bickel || HOF || align=right | 3.0 km || 
|-id=906 bgcolor=#E9E9E9
| 208906 ||  || — || October 6, 2002 || Haleakala || NEAT || — || align=right | 2.3 km || 
|-id=907 bgcolor=#E9E9E9
| 208907 ||  || — || October 5, 2002 || Socorro || LINEAR || — || align=right | 1.6 km || 
|-id=908 bgcolor=#E9E9E9
| 208908 ||  || — || October 8, 2002 || Anderson Mesa || LONEOS || — || align=right | 4.2 km || 
|-id=909 bgcolor=#E9E9E9
| 208909 ||  || — || October 9, 2002 || Socorro || LINEAR || — || align=right | 3.3 km || 
|-id=910 bgcolor=#E9E9E9
| 208910 ||  || — || October 7, 2002 || Socorro || LINEAR || — || align=right | 1.3 km || 
|-id=911 bgcolor=#E9E9E9
| 208911 ||  || — || October 10, 2002 || Socorro || LINEAR || — || align=right | 4.4 km || 
|-id=912 bgcolor=#E9E9E9
| 208912 ||  || — || October 10, 2002 || Socorro || LINEAR || — || align=right | 2.5 km || 
|-id=913 bgcolor=#E9E9E9
| 208913 ||  || — || October 10, 2002 || Socorro || LINEAR || JUN || align=right | 1.5 km || 
|-id=914 bgcolor=#d6d6d6
| 208914 ||  || — || October 4, 2002 || Apache Point || SDSS || — || align=right | 3.9 km || 
|-id=915 bgcolor=#E9E9E9
| 208915 Andrewashcraft ||  ||  || October 4, 2002 || Apache Point || SDSS || — || align=right | 3.3 km || 
|-id=916 bgcolor=#E9E9E9
| 208916 Robertcaldwell ||  ||  || October 5, 2002 || Apache Point || SDSS || — || align=right | 3.5 km || 
|-id=917 bgcolor=#E9E9E9
| 208917 Traviscarter ||  ||  || October 10, 2002 || Apache Point || SDSS || — || align=right | 2.5 km || 
|-id=918 bgcolor=#E9E9E9
| 208918 ||  || — || October 5, 2002 || Palomar || NEAT || — || align=right | 2.1 km || 
|-id=919 bgcolor=#E9E9E9
| 208919 ||  || — || October 28, 2002 || Nogales || C. W. Juels, P. R. Holvorcem || — || align=right | 3.3 km || 
|-id=920 bgcolor=#fefefe
| 208920 ||  || — || October 28, 2002 || Socorro || LINEAR || H || align=right | 1.1 km || 
|-id=921 bgcolor=#d6d6d6
| 208921 ||  || — || October 28, 2002 || Palomar || NEAT || — || align=right | 4.5 km || 
|-id=922 bgcolor=#d6d6d6
| 208922 ||  || — || October 28, 2002 || Haleakala || NEAT || — || align=right | 5.6 km || 
|-id=923 bgcolor=#fefefe
| 208923 ||  || — || October 30, 2002 || Socorro || LINEAR || H || align=right | 1.0 km || 
|-id=924 bgcolor=#d6d6d6
| 208924 ||  || — || October 30, 2002 || Haleakala || NEAT || — || align=right | 4.6 km || 
|-id=925 bgcolor=#E9E9E9
| 208925 ||  || — || October 30, 2002 || Haleakala || NEAT || — || align=right | 3.6 km || 
|-id=926 bgcolor=#d6d6d6
| 208926 ||  || — || October 31, 2002 || Anderson Mesa || LONEOS || — || align=right | 3.4 km || 
|-id=927 bgcolor=#E9E9E9
| 208927 ||  || — || October 31, 2002 || Anderson Mesa || LONEOS || WIT || align=right | 1.9 km || 
|-id=928 bgcolor=#d6d6d6
| 208928 ||  || — || October 31, 2002 || Palomar || NEAT || — || align=right | 2.6 km || 
|-id=929 bgcolor=#d6d6d6
| 208929 ||  || — || October 30, 2002 || Palomar || NEAT || KOR || align=right | 1.5 km || 
|-id=930 bgcolor=#E9E9E9
| 208930 ||  || — || October 31, 2002 || Haleakala || NEAT || HOF || align=right | 4.3 km || 
|-id=931 bgcolor=#E9E9E9
| 208931 ||  || — || November 1, 2002 || La Palma || La Palma Obs. || NEM || align=right | 3.2 km || 
|-id=932 bgcolor=#E9E9E9
| 208932 ||  || — || November 3, 2002 || Haleakala || NEAT || BRU || align=right | 5.2 km || 
|-id=933 bgcolor=#d6d6d6
| 208933 ||  || — || November 4, 2002 || Anderson Mesa || LONEOS || — || align=right | 5.4 km || 
|-id=934 bgcolor=#d6d6d6
| 208934 ||  || — || November 5, 2002 || Anderson Mesa || LONEOS || 629 || align=right | 2.4 km || 
|-id=935 bgcolor=#d6d6d6
| 208935 ||  || — || November 5, 2002 || Socorro || LINEAR || — || align=right | 2.9 km || 
|-id=936 bgcolor=#E9E9E9
| 208936 ||  || — || November 5, 2002 || Palomar || NEAT || PAD || align=right | 2.6 km || 
|-id=937 bgcolor=#E9E9E9
| 208937 ||  || — || November 4, 2002 || Palomar || NEAT || — || align=right | 2.8 km || 
|-id=938 bgcolor=#E9E9E9
| 208938 ||  || — || November 4, 2002 || La Palma || La Palma Obs. || — || align=right | 2.5 km || 
|-id=939 bgcolor=#d6d6d6
| 208939 ||  || — || November 6, 2002 || Anderson Mesa || LONEOS || — || align=right | 4.7 km || 
|-id=940 bgcolor=#E9E9E9
| 208940 ||  || — || November 6, 2002 || Haleakala || NEAT || — || align=right | 2.9 km || 
|-id=941 bgcolor=#E9E9E9
| 208941 ||  || — || November 6, 2002 || Needville || Needville Obs. || MIS || align=right | 3.4 km || 
|-id=942 bgcolor=#E9E9E9
| 208942 ||  || — || November 3, 2002 || Haleakala || NEAT || — || align=right | 2.9 km || 
|-id=943 bgcolor=#E9E9E9
| 208943 ||  || — || November 11, 2002 || Anderson Mesa || LONEOS || — || align=right | 4.8 km || 
|-id=944 bgcolor=#d6d6d6
| 208944 ||  || — || November 12, 2002 || Socorro || LINEAR || — || align=right | 4.8 km || 
|-id=945 bgcolor=#E9E9E9
| 208945 ||  || — || November 13, 2002 || Socorro || LINEAR || — || align=right | 4.5 km || 
|-id=946 bgcolor=#E9E9E9
| 208946 ||  || — || November 13, 2002 || Palomar || NEAT || DOR || align=right | 4.9 km || 
|-id=947 bgcolor=#d6d6d6
| 208947 ||  || — || November 13, 2002 || Palomar || NEAT || — || align=right | 3.4 km || 
|-id=948 bgcolor=#d6d6d6
| 208948 ||  || — || November 13, 2002 || Palomar || NEAT || EOS || align=right | 2.9 km || 
|-id=949 bgcolor=#d6d6d6
| 208949 ||  || — || November 12, 2002 || Palomar || NEAT || — || align=right | 3.8 km || 
|-id=950 bgcolor=#d6d6d6
| 208950 ||  || — || November 14, 2002 || Palomar || NEAT || EOS || align=right | 3.1 km || 
|-id=951 bgcolor=#d6d6d6
| 208951 ||  || — || November 23, 2002 || Palomar || NEAT || KOR || align=right | 2.2 km || 
|-id=952 bgcolor=#d6d6d6
| 208952 ||  || — || November 21, 2002 || Palomar || NEAT || EOS || align=right | 3.0 km || 
|-id=953 bgcolor=#E9E9E9
| 208953 ||  || — || November 24, 2002 || Palomar || NEAT || — || align=right | 4.2 km || 
|-id=954 bgcolor=#d6d6d6
| 208954 ||  || — || November 24, 2002 || Palomar || NEAT || — || align=right | 5.4 km || 
|-id=955 bgcolor=#E9E9E9
| 208955 ||  || — || November 25, 2002 || Palomar || NEAT || AGN || align=right | 1.5 km || 
|-id=956 bgcolor=#d6d6d6
| 208956 || 2002 XV || — || December 1, 2002 || Socorro || LINEAR || — || align=right | 2.8 km || 
|-id=957 bgcolor=#d6d6d6
| 208957 ||  || — || December 2, 2002 || Haleakala || NEAT || — || align=right | 2.9 km || 
|-id=958 bgcolor=#d6d6d6
| 208958 ||  || — || December 3, 2002 || Palomar || NEAT || — || align=right | 4.0 km || 
|-id=959 bgcolor=#d6d6d6
| 208959 ||  || — || December 3, 2002 || Palomar || NEAT || — || align=right | 4.9 km || 
|-id=960 bgcolor=#d6d6d6
| 208960 ||  || — || December 2, 2002 || Haleakala || NEAT || EUP || align=right | 6.8 km || 
|-id=961 bgcolor=#d6d6d6
| 208961 ||  || — || December 7, 2002 || Desert Eagle || W. K. Y. Yeung || — || align=right | 5.6 km || 
|-id=962 bgcolor=#d6d6d6
| 208962 ||  || — || December 5, 2002 || Socorro || LINEAR || TEL || align=right | 5.7 km || 
|-id=963 bgcolor=#d6d6d6
| 208963 ||  || — || December 10, 2002 || Socorro || LINEAR || — || align=right | 4.2 km || 
|-id=964 bgcolor=#d6d6d6
| 208964 ||  || — || December 11, 2002 || Socorro || LINEAR || — || align=right | 5.9 km || 
|-id=965 bgcolor=#d6d6d6
| 208965 ||  || — || December 10, 2002 || Socorro || LINEAR || — || align=right | 3.6 km || 
|-id=966 bgcolor=#fefefe
| 208966 ||  || — || December 11, 2002 || Socorro || LINEAR || H || align=right data-sort-value="0.95" | 950 m || 
|-id=967 bgcolor=#d6d6d6
| 208967 ||  || — || December 11, 2002 || Socorro || LINEAR || — || align=right | 3.9 km || 
|-id=968 bgcolor=#d6d6d6
| 208968 ||  || — || December 11, 2002 || Socorro || LINEAR || — || align=right | 4.9 km || 
|-id=969 bgcolor=#d6d6d6
| 208969 ||  || — || December 13, 2002 || Socorro || LINEAR || — || align=right | 5.4 km || 
|-id=970 bgcolor=#d6d6d6
| 208970 ||  || — || December 4, 2002 || Kitt Peak || M. W. Buie || EUP || align=right | 6.3 km || 
|-id=971 bgcolor=#d6d6d6
| 208971 ||  || — || December 5, 2002 || Kitt Peak || M. W. Buie || — || align=right | 5.1 km || 
|-id=972 bgcolor=#d6d6d6
| 208972 ||  || — || December 5, 2002 || Socorro || LINEAR || EUP || align=right | 9.5 km || 
|-id=973 bgcolor=#d6d6d6
| 208973 ||  || — || December 5, 2002 || Socorro || LINEAR || — || align=right | 4.5 km || 
|-id=974 bgcolor=#d6d6d6
| 208974 ||  || — || December 3, 2002 || Palomar || NEAT || KAR || align=right | 1.8 km || 
|-id=975 bgcolor=#d6d6d6
| 208975 || 2002 YE || — || December 27, 2002 || Anderson Mesa || LONEOS || LIX || align=right | 6.3 km || 
|-id=976 bgcolor=#d6d6d6
| 208976 ||  || — || December 28, 2002 || Socorro || LINEAR || EUP || align=right | 4.2 km || 
|-id=977 bgcolor=#d6d6d6
| 208977 ||  || — || December 31, 2002 || Socorro || LINEAR || — || align=right | 5.0 km || 
|-id=978 bgcolor=#d6d6d6
| 208978 ||  || — || December 31, 2002 || Socorro || LINEAR || EUP || align=right | 6.6 km || 
|-id=979 bgcolor=#d6d6d6
| 208979 ||  || — || December 31, 2002 || Socorro || LINEAR || — || align=right | 3.4 km || 
|-id=980 bgcolor=#d6d6d6
| 208980 ||  || — || December 31, 2002 || Socorro || LINEAR || — || align=right | 6.3 km || 
|-id=981 bgcolor=#d6d6d6
| 208981 ||  || — || December 31, 2002 || Socorro || LINEAR || THM || align=right | 3.3 km || 
|-id=982 bgcolor=#d6d6d6
| 208982 ||  || — || January 3, 2003 || Socorro || LINEAR || EUP || align=right | 5.9 km || 
|-id=983 bgcolor=#d6d6d6
| 208983 ||  || — || January 3, 2003 || Socorro || LINEAR || EUP || align=right | 3.6 km || 
|-id=984 bgcolor=#d6d6d6
| 208984 ||  || — || January 1, 2003 || Socorro || LINEAR || — || align=right | 6.4 km || 
|-id=985 bgcolor=#d6d6d6
| 208985 ||  || — || January 1, 2003 || Socorro || LINEAR || — || align=right | 4.2 km || 
|-id=986 bgcolor=#d6d6d6
| 208986 ||  || — || January 2, 2003 || Socorro || LINEAR || EMA || align=right | 5.9 km || 
|-id=987 bgcolor=#d6d6d6
| 208987 ||  || — || January 5, 2003 || Socorro || LINEAR || EOS || align=right | 3.4 km || 
|-id=988 bgcolor=#d6d6d6
| 208988 ||  || — || January 4, 2003 || Socorro || LINEAR || — || align=right | 3.6 km || 
|-id=989 bgcolor=#d6d6d6
| 208989 ||  || — || January 5, 2003 || Socorro || LINEAR || HYG || align=right | 4.7 km || 
|-id=990 bgcolor=#d6d6d6
| 208990 ||  || — || January 5, 2003 || Socorro || LINEAR || — || align=right | 4.7 km || 
|-id=991 bgcolor=#d6d6d6
| 208991 ||  || — || January 7, 2003 || Socorro || LINEAR || — || align=right | 4.7 km || 
|-id=992 bgcolor=#d6d6d6
| 208992 ||  || — || January 7, 2003 || Socorro || LINEAR || EUP || align=right | 6.5 km || 
|-id=993 bgcolor=#d6d6d6
| 208993 ||  || — || January 8, 2003 || Socorro || LINEAR || — || align=right | 2.8 km || 
|-id=994 bgcolor=#d6d6d6
| 208994 ||  || — || January 10, 2003 || Socorro || LINEAR || THB || align=right | 6.0 km || 
|-id=995 bgcolor=#d6d6d6
| 208995 ||  || — || January 12, 2003 || Anderson Mesa || LONEOS || TIR || align=right | 5.0 km || 
|-id=996 bgcolor=#C2E0FF
| 208996 ||  || — || January 13, 2003 || Palomar || C. Trujillo, M. E. Brown || plutinomoon || align=right | 766 km || 
|-id=997 bgcolor=#d6d6d6
| 208997 ||  || — || January 1, 2003 || Socorro || LINEAR || — || align=right | 3.9 km || 
|-id=998 bgcolor=#d6d6d6
| 208998 ||  || — || January 3, 2003 || Socorro || LINEAR || EUP || align=right | 7.2 km || 
|-id=999 bgcolor=#d6d6d6
| 208999 ||  || — || January 24, 2003 || Pla D'Arguines || R. Ferrando || — || align=right | 5.8 km || 
|-id=000 bgcolor=#d6d6d6
| 209000 ||  || — || January 26, 2003 || Kitt Peak || Spacewatch || — || align=right | 6.7 km || 
|}

References

External links 
 Discovery Circumstances: Numbered Minor Planets (205001)–(210000) (IAU Minor Planet Center)

0208